= Lamb-McSwain House =

Historic house in Arkansas, United States

- U.S. National Register of Historic Places
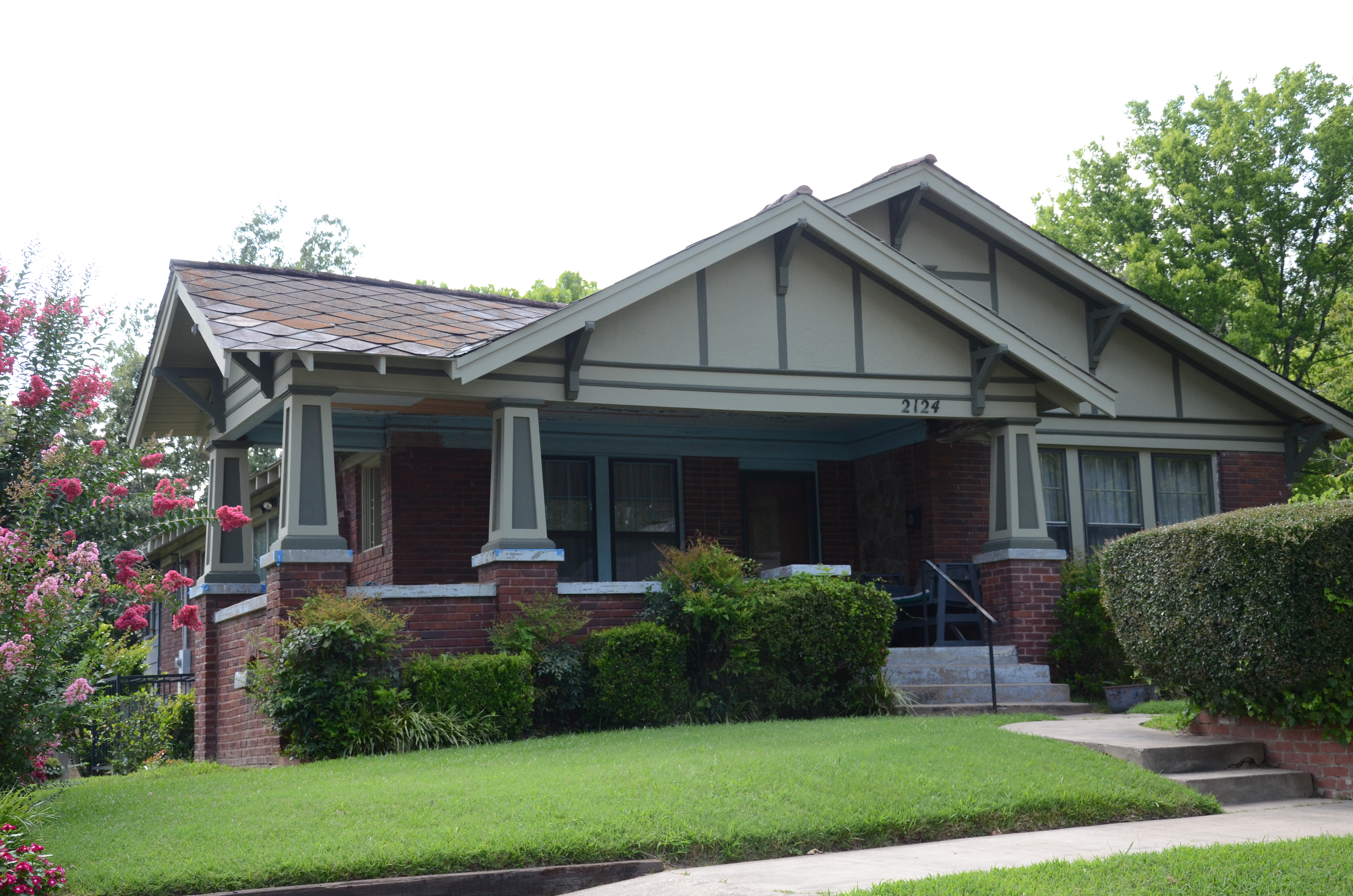

- Location within Arkansas Location within the United States
- Location: 2124 Rice St., Little Rock, Arkansas
- Coordinates: 34°43′45″N 92°18′3″W
- Area: less than one acre
- Built: 1926
- Architect: Multiple
- Architectural style: Bungalow/craftsman
- NRHP reference No.: 98000621
- Added to NRHP: June 4, 1998

The Lamb-McSwain House is a historic house at 2124 Rice Street in Little Rock, Arkansas. It is a single-story wood-frame structure, clad in a brick veneer with half-timbered wood and stucco gables. It is a sophisticated expression of Craftsman style, with sloping square paneled columns supporting the porch, and gables with extended eaves supported by large brackets. The house was built in 1926 by John W. Lamb, a United States Postal Service employee, and is architecturally significant as a rare local example of a house built from mail-order blueprints (still in the current owner's possession) by an African-American.

The house was listed on the National Register of Historic Places in 1998.

== See also ==
- National Register of Historic Places listings in Little Rock, Arkansas
