= Dr. Morgan Smith House =

Historic house in Arkansas, United States

- U.S. National Register of Historic Places
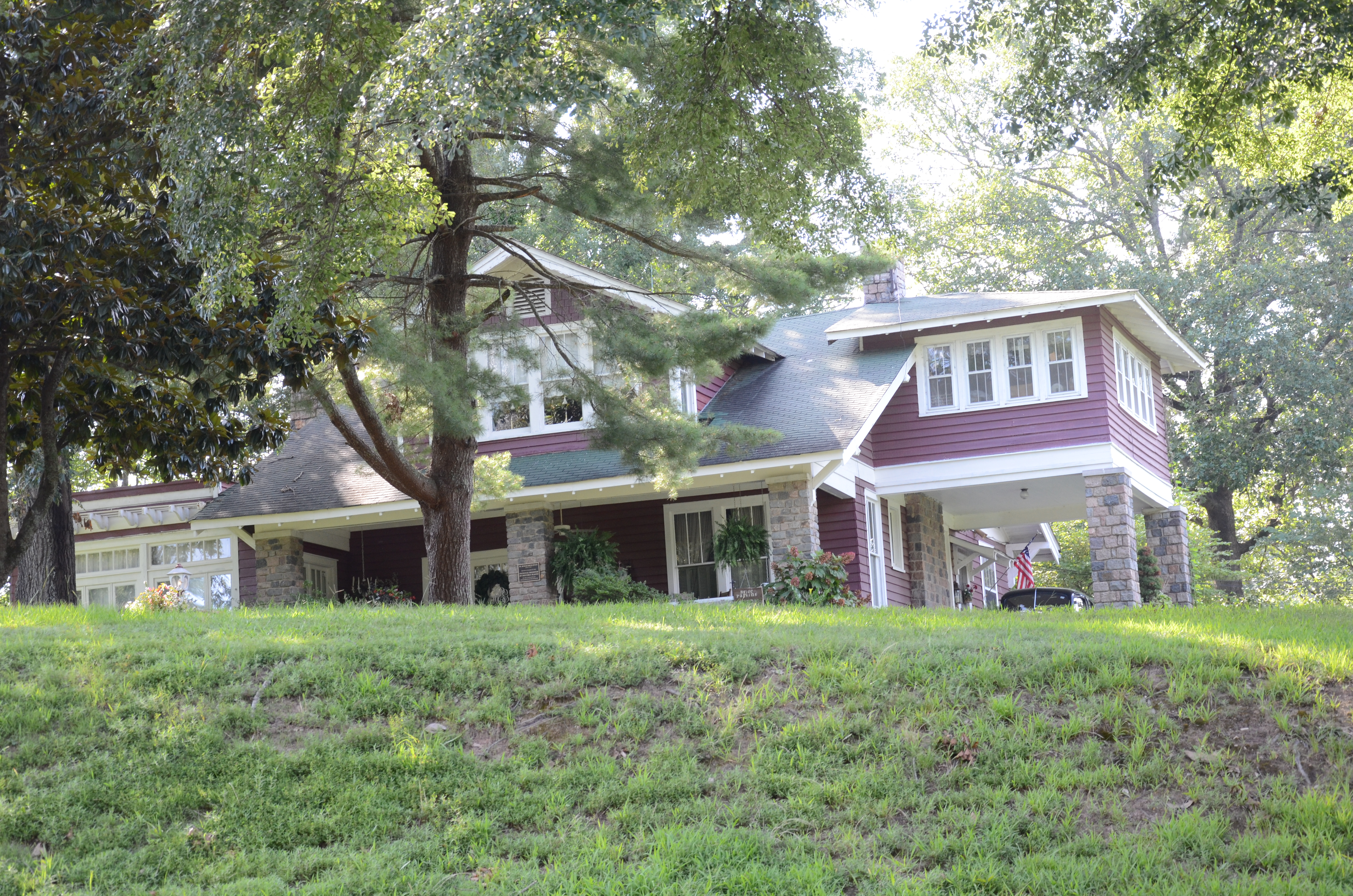

- Location within Arkansas Location within the United States
- Location: 5110 Stagecoach Rd., Little Rock, Arkansas
- Coordinates: 34°42′11″N 92°23′4″W
- Area: 2 acres (0.81 ha)
- Architectural style: Bungalow/craftsman
- NRHP reference No.: 09000323
- Added to NRHP: May 20, 2009

The Dr. Morgan Smith House is a historic house at 5110 Stagecoach Road in Little Rock, Arkansas. It is a two-story wood-frame structure, with a complex roof line and weatherboard siding. It is a sophisticated example of Craftsman styling, with a porch and porte-cochere supported by stone columns (supposedly built using cobblestones from central Little Rock), and extended eaves with exposed rafter tails. The house was built in 1918 for a prominent local doctor, housing both his home and office.

The house was listed on the National Register of Historic Places in 2009.

== See also ==
- National Register of Historic Places listings in Little Rock, Arkansas
