= Marshall Square Historic District =

Historic district in Arkansas, United States

- U.S. National Register of Historic Places
- U.S. Historic district
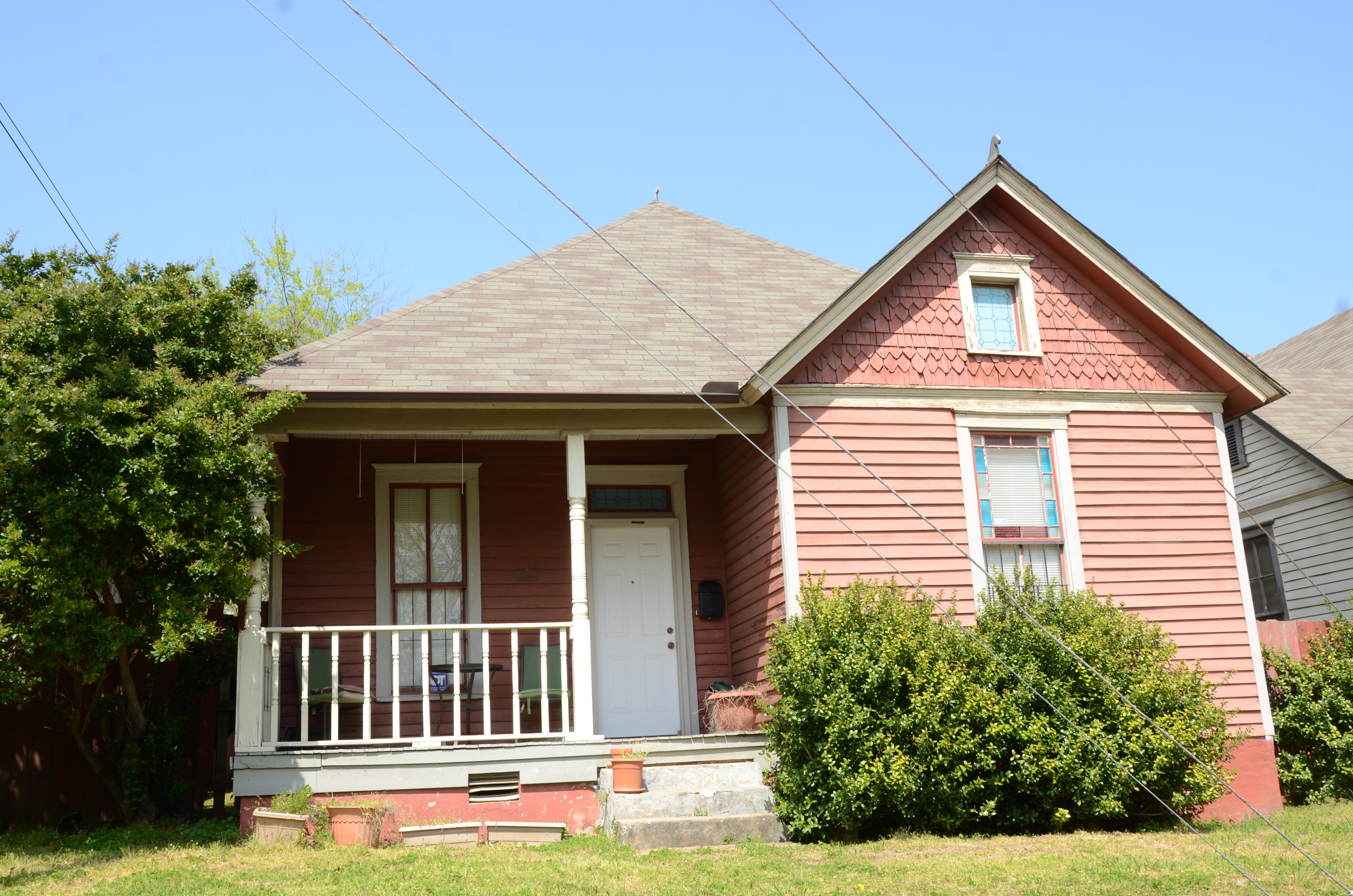

- Location within Arkansas Location within the United States
- Location: Bounded by 17th, McAlmont, 18th, and Vance Sts., Little Rock, Arkansas
- Coordinates: 34°43′52″N 92°15′50″W
- Area: 2 acres (0.81 ha)
- Built: 1917
- Architect: Josephus C. Marshall
- Architectural style: Late Victorian
- NRHP reference No.: 79000453
- Added to NRHP: August 10, 1979

The Marshall Square Historic District encompasses a collection of sixteen nearly identical houses in Little Rock, Arkansas. The houses are set on 17th (south side) and 18th (north side) Streets between McAlmont and Vance Streets, and were built in 1917-18 as rental properties Josephus C. Marshall. All are single-story wood-frame structures, with hip roofs and projecting front gables, and are built to essentially identical floor plans. They exhibit only minor variations, in the placement of porches and dormers, and in the type of fenestration.

The district was listed on the National Register of Historic Places in 1979.

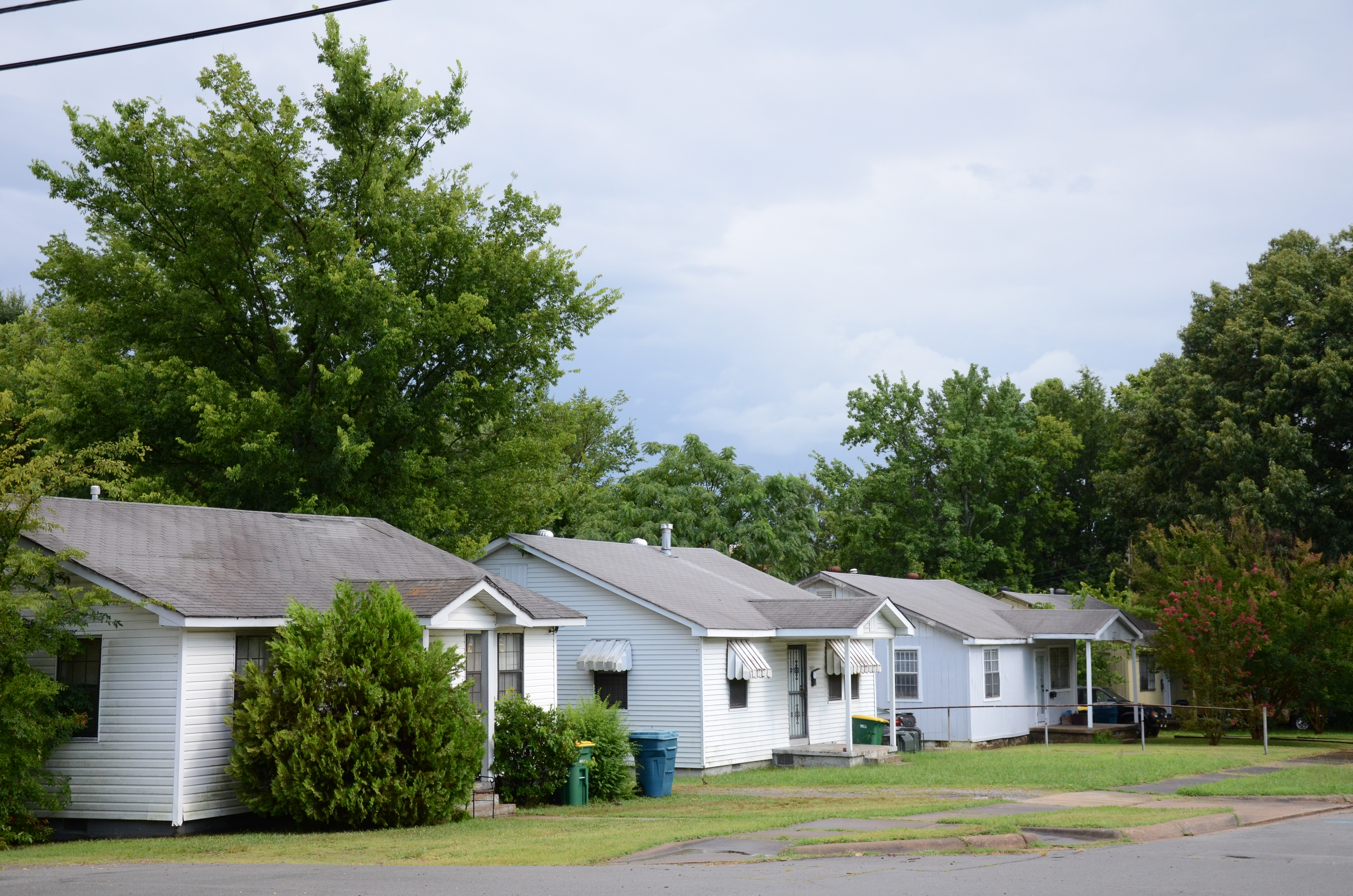
Houses on Vance Street, Little Rock, Arkansas

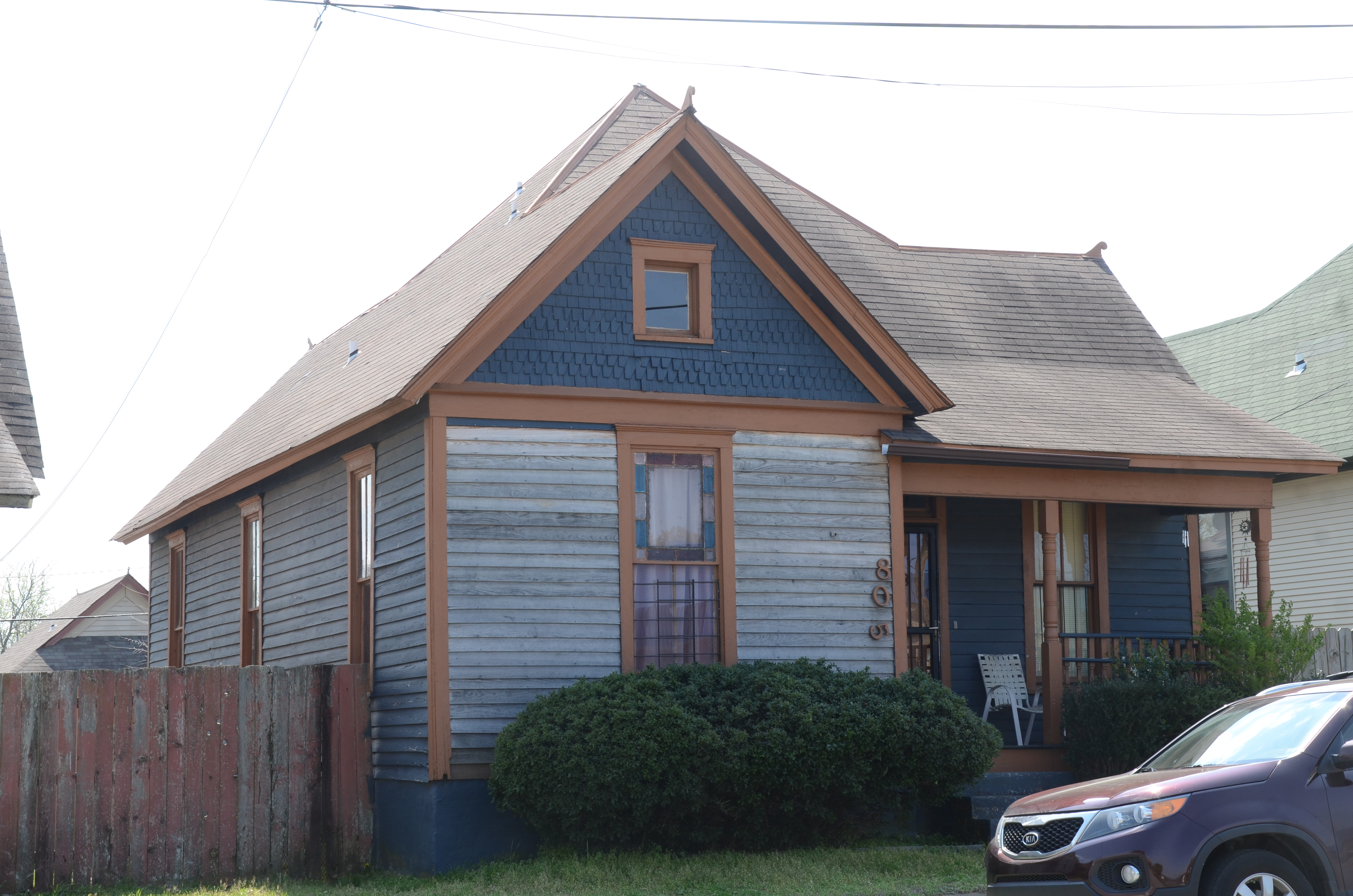
Old and new: house with car in Marshall Square Historic District

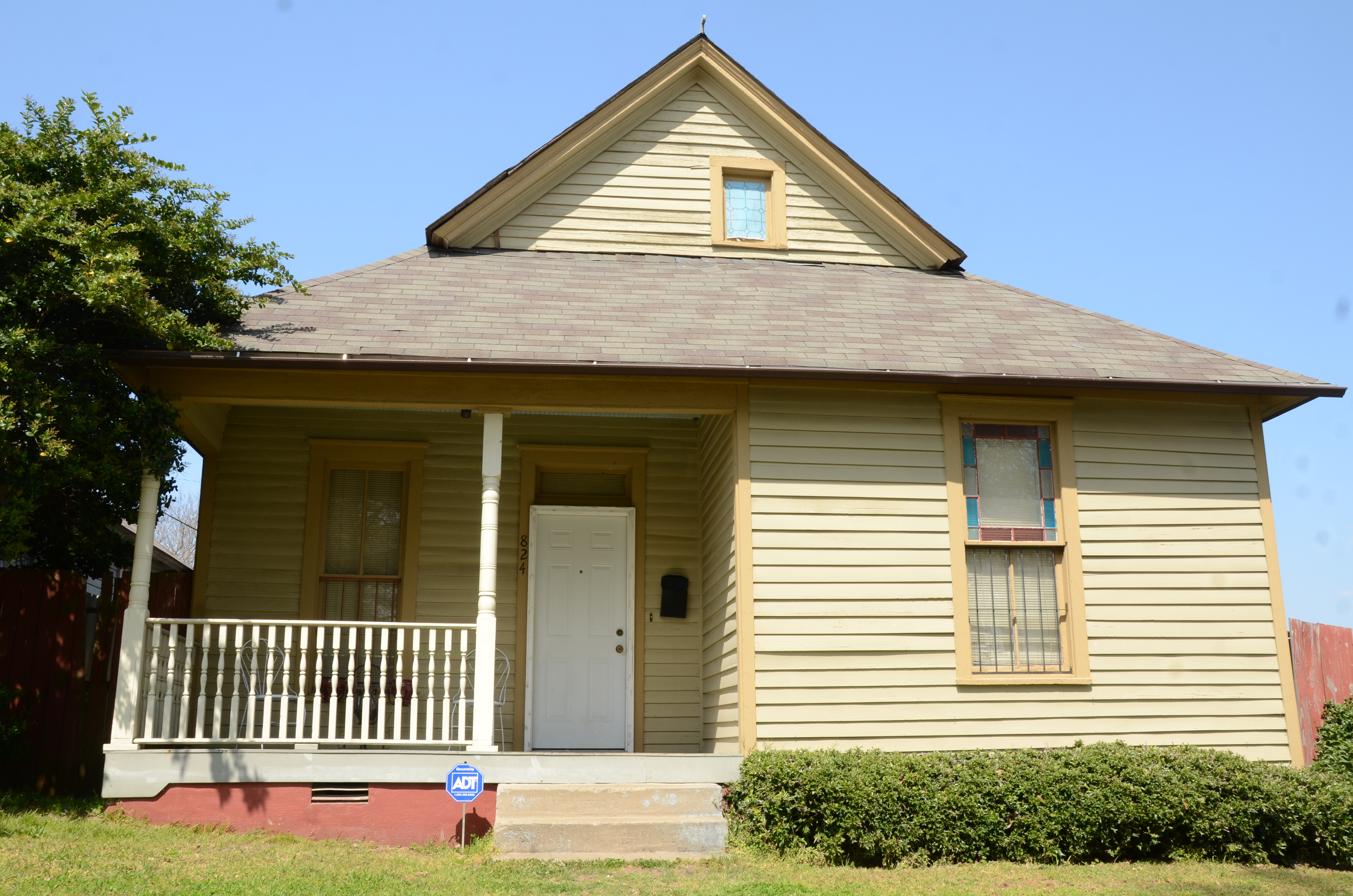
Yellow theme: house in Marshall Square Historic District

== See also ==
- National Register of Historic Places listings in Little Rock, Arkansas
