= Railroad Call Historic District =

Historic house in Arkansas, United States

- U.S. National Register of Historic Places
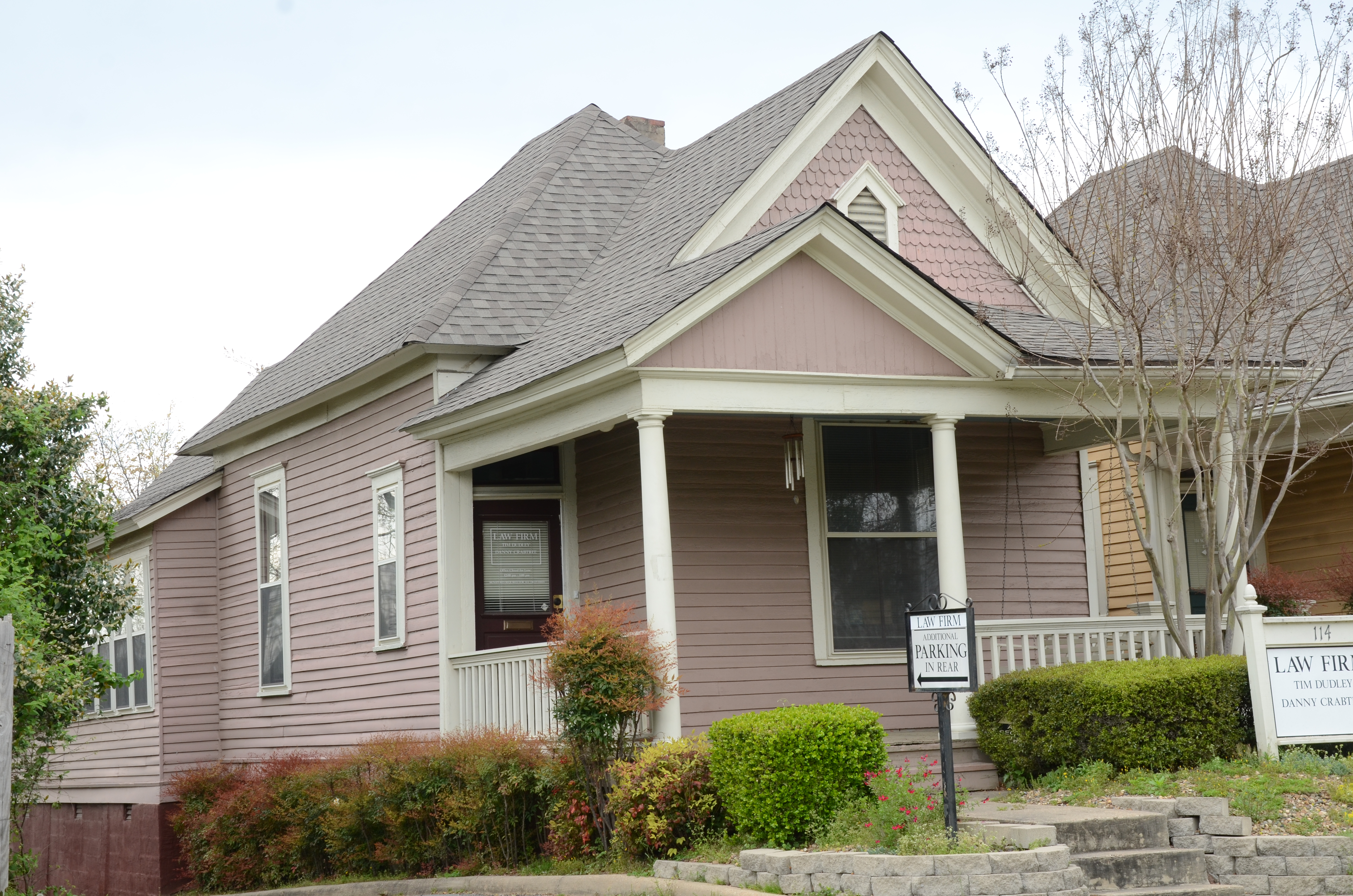

- Location within Arkansas Location within the United States
- Location: 104,108, 112, and 114 S. Pulaski St., 1302 and 1304 West 2nd St., Little Rock, Arkansas
- Coordinates: 34°44′59″N 92°17′48″W
- Area: less than one acre
- Architectural style: Colonial Revival
- NRHP reference No.: 97000749 (original); 100008974 (increase)

Significant dates
- Added to NRHP: July 9, 1997
- Boundary increase: February 15, 2024

The Railroad Call Historic District encompasses six adjacent railroad worker housing units at 104, 108, 1112, and 114 South Pulaski Street, and 1302 and 1304 West 2nd Street in Little Rock, Arkansas. All are single-story wood frame Colonial Revival structures, with gabled roofs and weatherboard siding, with some use of wooden shingles in gable ends. Two of the buildings have full-width front porches; the third has a half-width porch. These houses were built for workers constructing the nearby Missouri Pacific Railroad station (now the site of the 1921 Little Rock Union Station). The buildings were saved from demolition in 1996 and converted to offices.

Three of the buildings were listed on the National Register of Historic Places in 1997; the other three were added in a boundary enlargement in 2024.

== See also ==
- National Register of Historic Places listings in Little Rock, Arkansas
