= Dr. Eugene Towbin House =

Historic house in Arkansas, United States

- U.S. National Register of Historic Places
- Location within Arkansas Location within the United States
- Location: 16 Broadview Dr., Little Rock, Arkansas
- Coordinates: 34°45′57″N 92°20′56″W
- Built: 1960
- Architect: Beck, Hollis
- Architectural style: Mid-Century Modern
- NRHP reference No.: 100003336
- Added to NRHP: January 24, 2019

The Eugene Towbin House is a historic house at 16 Broadview Drive in Little Rock, Arkansas, United States. It was built in 1960 to a design by Hollis Beck, and is a good local example of Mid-Century Modern architecture. It is a single-story frame structure, its walls finished in vertical board siding and resting on a concrete block foundation. It is covered by a low-pitch side-facing gabled roof with deep eaves. The roof extends to the right beyond the main block to also shelter a carport. Eugene Towbin, for whose family the house was built, was a prominent physician in Little Rock.

The house was listed on the National Register of Historic Places in 2019.

== See also ==
- National Register of Historic Places listings in Little Rock, Arkansas
