= Solomon Gans House =

Historic house in Arkansas, United States

- U.S. National Register of Historic Places
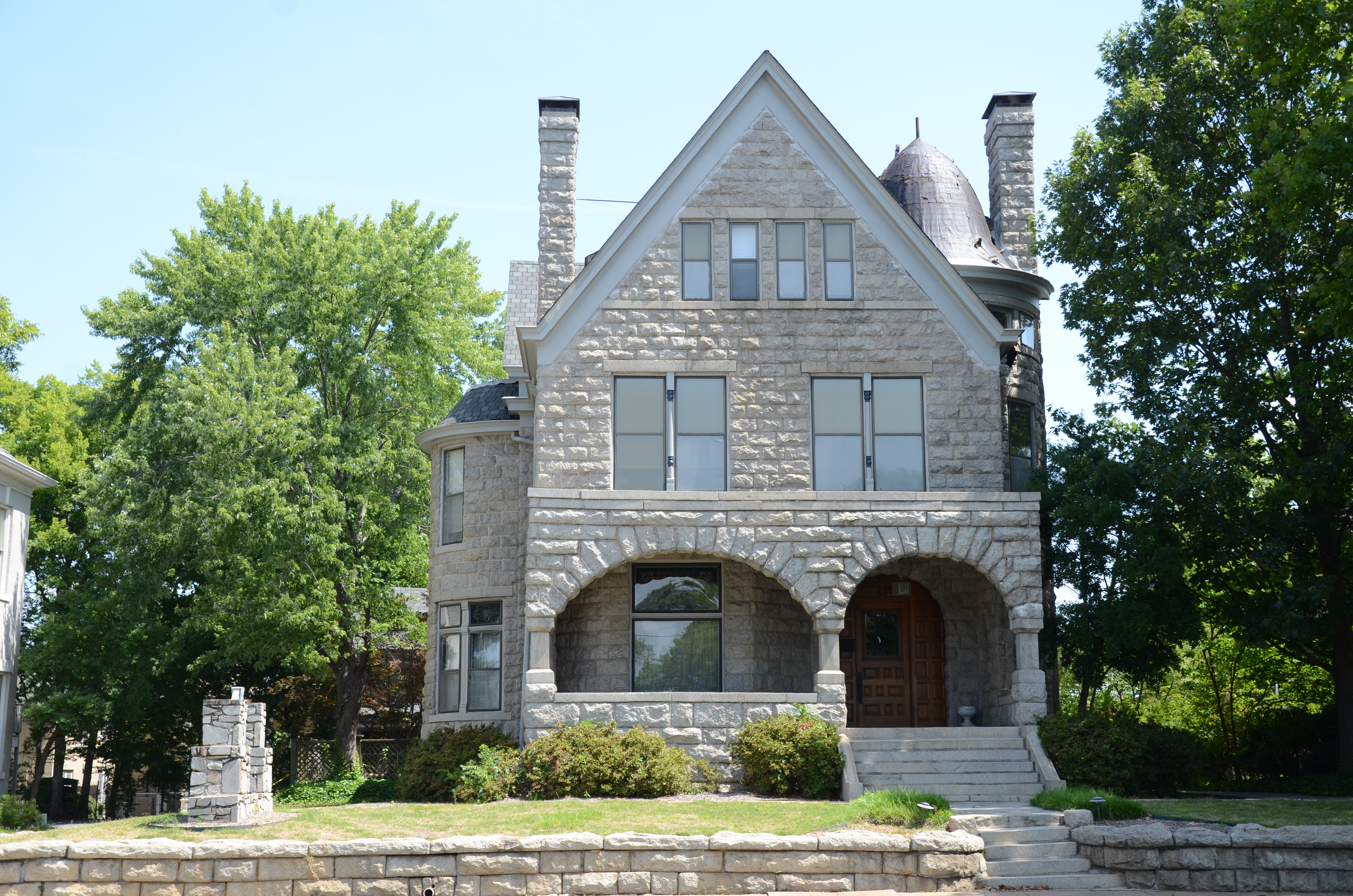

- Location within Arkansas Location within the United States
- Location: 1010 W. 3rd St., Little Rock, Arkansas
- Coordinates: 34°44′52″N 92°16′54″W
- Area: less than one acre
- Built: 1896
- Architectural style: Romanesque
- NRHP reference No.: 84000905
- Added to NRHP: March 29, 1984

The Solomon Gans House is a historic house at 1010 West 3rd Street in Little Rock, Arkansas. It is a 2 1/2-story masonry structure, built out of rusticated granite. Its front is dominated by a two-arched porch, and there is a turret with a bell-shaped roof on the right side. Built in 1896, it the only known local residence to be built in the Romanesque Revival style.

The house was listed on the National Register of Historic Places in 1984.

== See also ==
- National Register of Historic Places listings in Little Rock, Arkansas
