= Gustave B. Kleinschmidt House =

Historic house in Arkansas, United States

- U.S. National Register of Historic Places
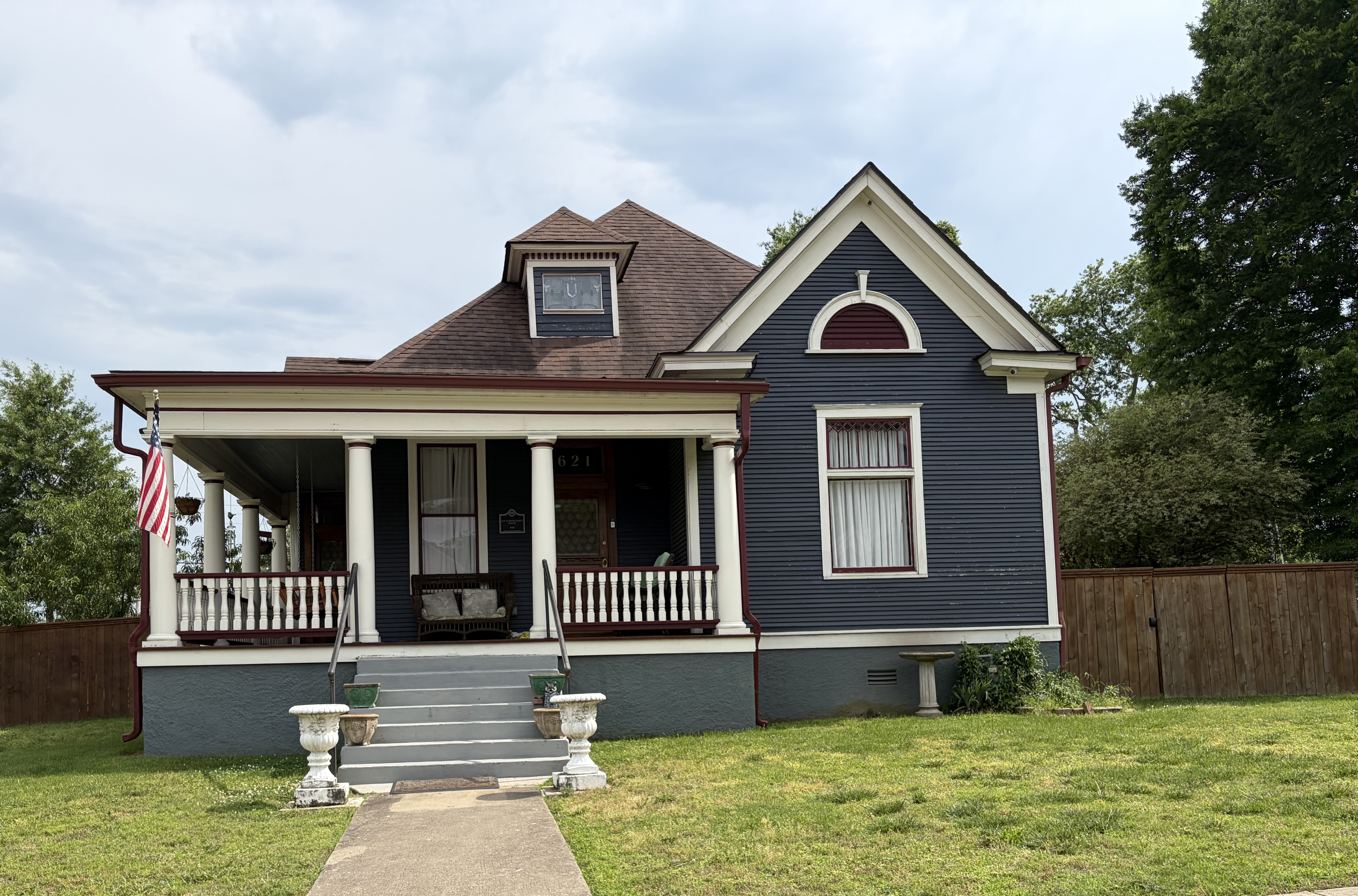
- The Kleinschmidt House in 2026

- Location within Arkansas Location within the United States
- Location: 621 E. 16th St., Little Rock, Arkansas
- Coordinates: 34°43′57″N 92°15′59″W
- Area: 1 acre (0.40 ha)
- Architectural style: Colonial Revival
- NRHP reference No.: 16000319
- Added to NRHP: June 7, 2016

The Gustave B. Kleinschmidt House is a historic house at 621 East 16th Street in Little Rock, Arkansas. It is a 1 1/2-story wood-frame structure, with a cross-gabled hip roof, original weatherboard siding, and stuccoed brick foundation. The front is asymmetrical, with a projecting gable section on the right, and an open wraparound porch on the right, supported by round columns. Built about 1907, it is an early local example of Colonial Revival architecture. Gustave Kleinschmidt, for whom it was built, was a German immigrant and a prominent local real estate agent.

The house was listed on the National Register of Historic Places in 2016.

== See also ==
- National Register of Historic Places listings in Little Rock, Arkansas
