= Buhler House =

Historic house in Arkansas, United States

- U.S. National Register of Historic Places
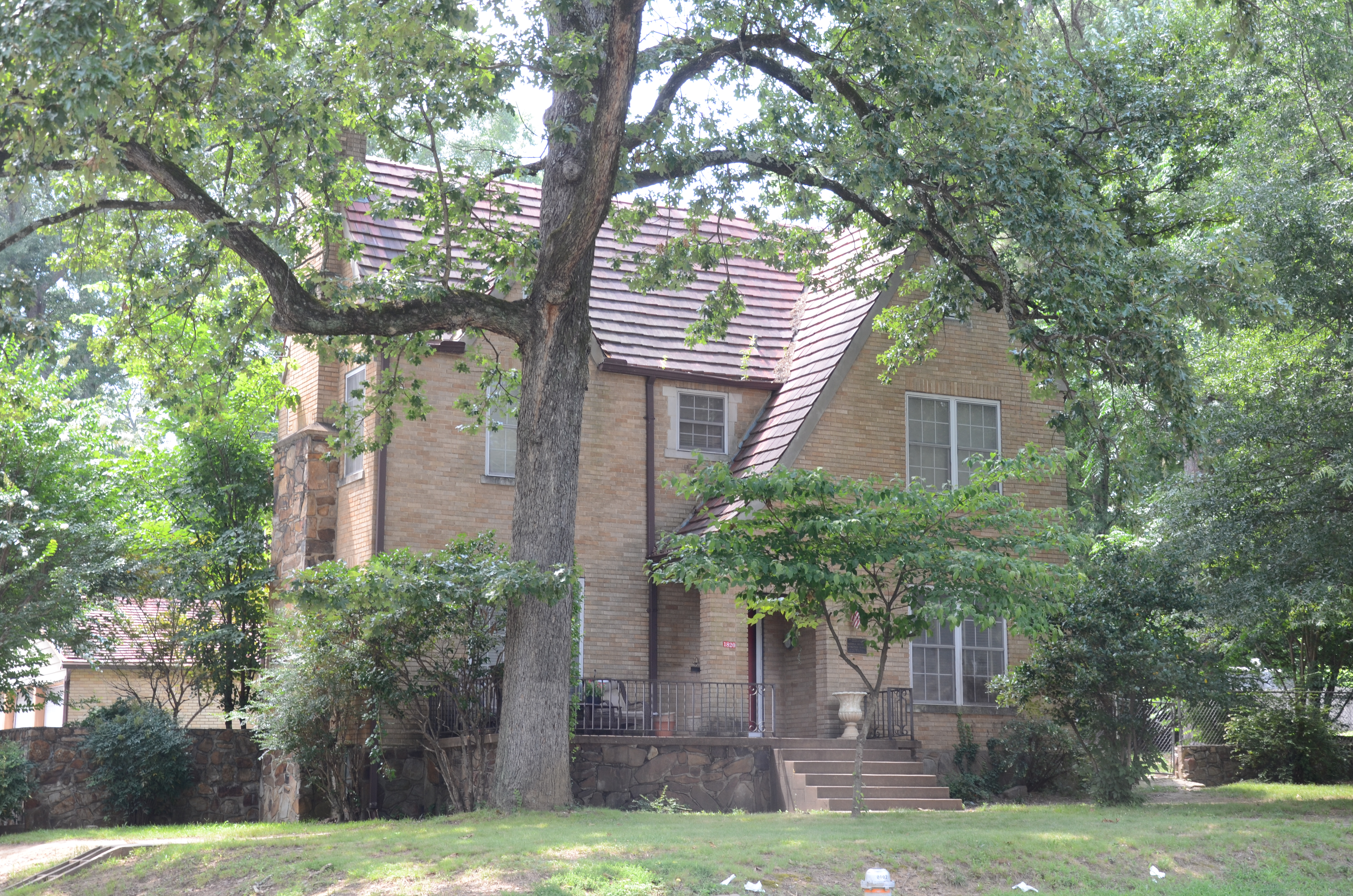

- Location within Arkansas Location within the United States
- Location: 1820 Fair Park Blvd., Little Rock, Arkansas
- Coordinates: 34°44′38″N 92°20′5″W
- Area: less than one acre
- Built: 1930
- Built by: Henry F. Buhler/Fourche River Land Co.
- Architectural style: Late 19th And 20th Century Revivals, English Revival
- NRHP reference No.: 88000433
- Added to NRHP: April 25, 1988

The Buhler House is a historic house at 1820 Fair Park Boulevard in Little Rock, Arkansas. It is a 2 1/2-story structure, its exterior clad in brick, set on a field stone foundation. Stylistically it is in the English Revival, with a tile roof and trim elements of concrete. The house's most distinctive feature is its internal frame, which is constructed entirely out of steel beams. Its exterior and interior door frames are also steel, as is the front door, which has been processed to resemble walnut. It was built in 1930-31 by Henry Buhler, owner of a local real estate development firm. No other residential structure in the state has been documented to have this type of construction.

The house was listed on the National Register of Historic Places in 1988.

== See also ==
- National Register of Historic Places listings in Little Rock, Arkansas
