= Thornton House (Little Rock, Arkansas) =

Historic house in Arkansas, United States

- U.S. National Register of Historic Places
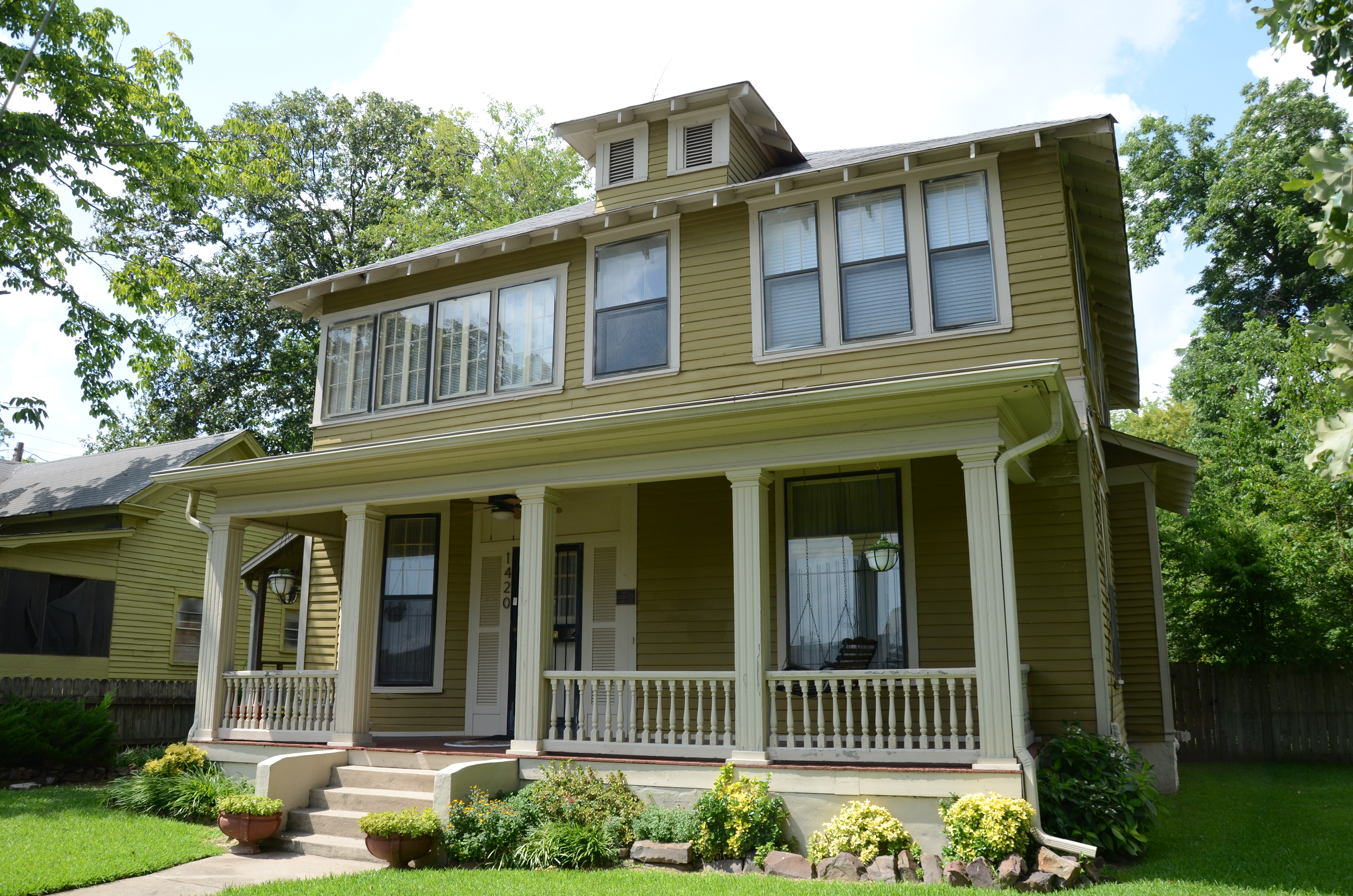

- Location within Arkansas Location within the United States
- Location: 1420 W. 15th St., Little Rock, Arkansas
- Coordinates: 34°44′12″N 92°17′20″W
- Area: less than one acre
- Built: 1906
- Architectural style: Bungalow/craftsman
- MPS: Historically Black Properties in Little Rock's Dunbar School Neighborhood MPS
- NRHP reference No.: 99000543
- Added to NRHP: May 28, 1999

The Thornton House is a historic house at 1420 West 15th Street in Little Rock, Arkansas. It is a two-story wood-frame American Foursquare house with a dormered hip roof, weatherboard siding, and a single-story porch across the front. Its roof and dormer have exposed rafter ends in the Craftsman style, and the porch is supported by fluted square columns with spindled balustrades between. The oldest portion of the house is a small cottage, built about 1896 and subsequently enlarged several times. It is prominent as the home in the early 20th century of Dr. John Thornton, a prominent African-American physician, and also briefly of Charlotte E. Stephens, the city's first African-American teacher.

The house was listed on the National Register of Historic Places in 1999.

== See also ==
- National Register of Historic Places listings in Little Rock, Arkansas
