= West 7th Street Historic District =

Historic district in Arkansas, United States

- U.S. National Register of Historic Places
- U.S. Historic district
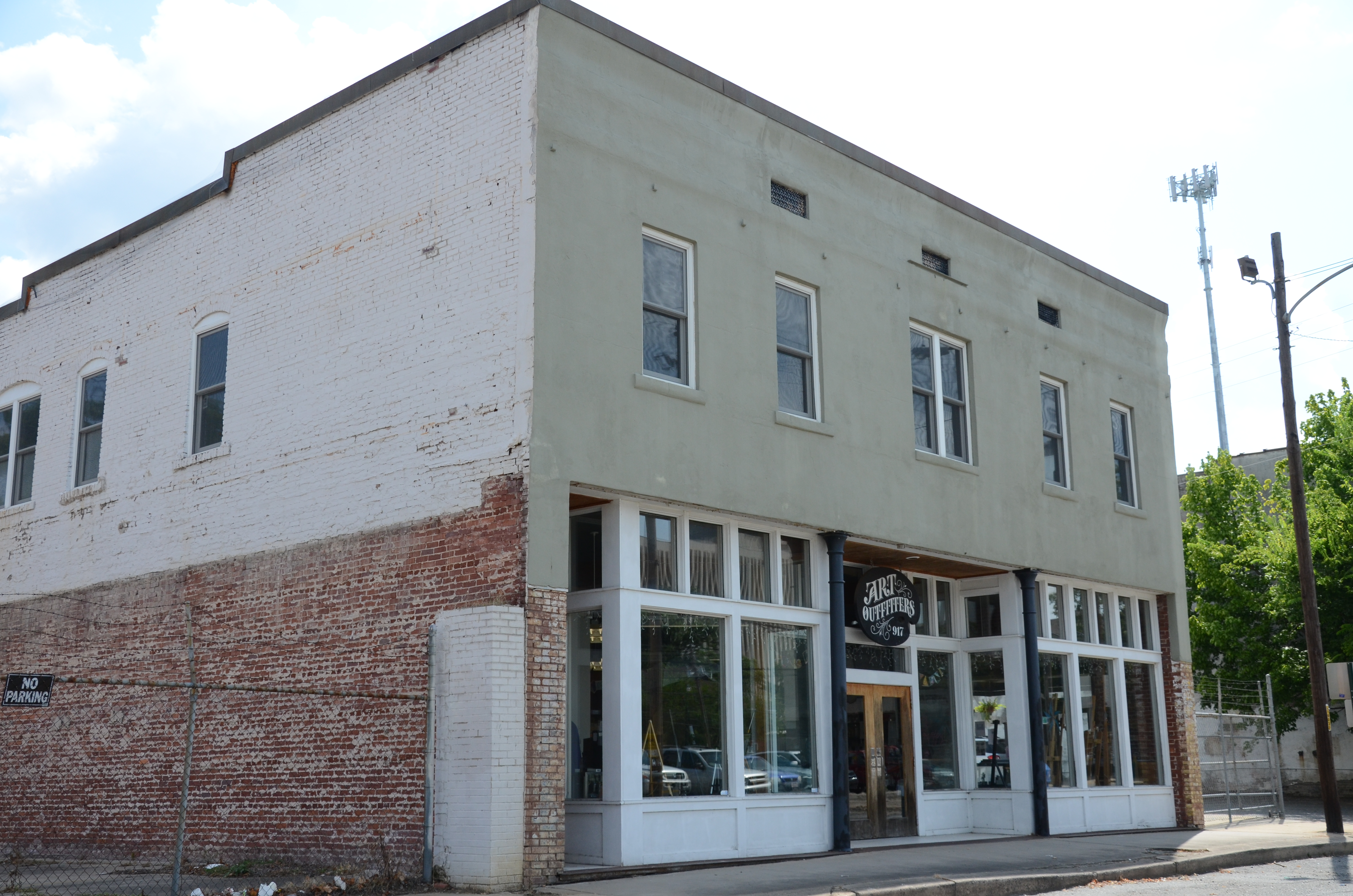

- Location within Arkansas Location within the United States
- Location: Portions of 800-1100 blocks of W. 7th St., Little Rock, Arkansas
- Coordinates: 34°44′43″N 92°16′56″W
- Area: 8 acres (3.2 ha)
- Built: 1909
- Architectural style: Italianate, Early Commercial
- NRHP reference No.: 08001341
- Added to NRHP: January 21, 2009

The West 7th Street Historic District encompasses a collection of early 20th-century commercial buildings on the 800-1100 blocks of West 7th Street in Little Rock, Arkansas. The thirteen buildings of the district were built between 1906 and 1951, and are mainly one and two-story masonry buildings with vernacular or modest commercial Italianate style. The Clok Building at 1001 W. 7th, built in 1915, notably has an elaborate concrete facade.

The district was listed on the National Register of Historic Places in 2009.

== See also ==
- National Register of Historic Places listings in Little Rock, Arkansas
