= Isaac Homard House =

Historic house in Arkansas, United States

- U.S. National Register of Historic Places
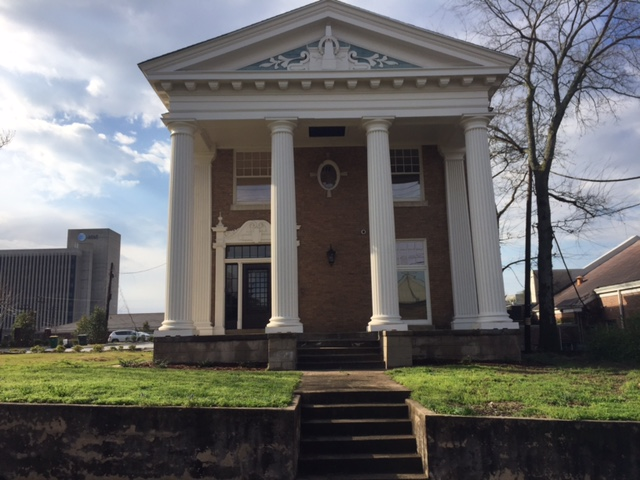

- Location within Arkansas Location within the United States
- Location: 1217 W. 3rd St., Little Rock, Arkansas
- Coordinates: 34°44′53″N 92°17′4″W
- Area: less than one acre
- Built: 1905
- Architectural style: Classical Revival
- NRHP reference No.: 100000777
- Added to NRHP: March 27, 2017

The Isaac Homard House is a historic house at 1217 West 3rd Street in Little Rock, Arkansas. It is a two-story brick building, with an ornate four-column temple front supported by fluted columns. The gable above is fully pedimented, with a central field of slate adorned by wood carving. Built in 1905 for a railroad machinist, it is a significant local example of Classical Revival architecture. The building has been rehabilitated for use as professional offices.

The house was listed on the National Register of Historic Places in 2017.

== See also ==
- National Register of Historic Places listings in Little Rock, Arkansas
