= Donaghey Building =

- U.S. National Register of Historic Places
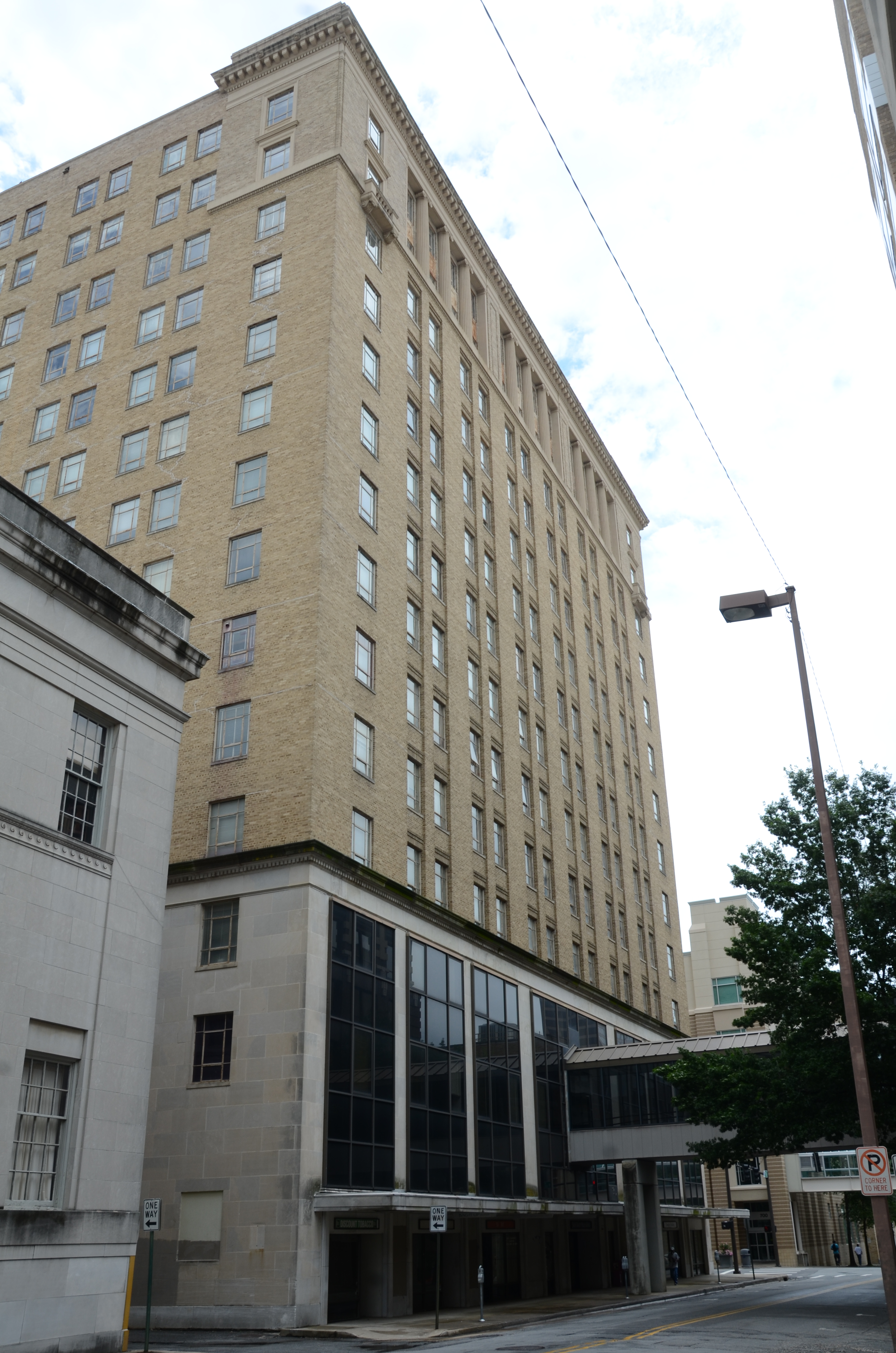

- Location within Arkansas Location within the United States
- Location: 103 E. 7th St., 703 S. Main St., Little Rock, Arkansas
- Coordinates: 34°44′31″N 92°16′16″W
- Area: less than one acre
- Built: 1925
- Architect: Hunter McDonnell
- NRHP reference No.: 12000355
- Added to NRHP: June 27, 2012

The Donaghey Building is a historic commercial building at 103 East 7th Street and 703 South Main Street in Little Rock, Arkansas. It is a fourteen-story structure, built out of reinforced concrete and faced in brick. The building forms a U shape, with a central courtyard open to the south. It was built in 1925–26 to a design by New York City architect Hunter McDonnell, and was Little Rock's tallest building for three decades, housing a variety of commercial offices, and retail spaces on the ground floor. It featured the latest advances in lighting, ventilation, and fire-resistant construction.

The building was listed on the National Register of Historic Places in 2012.

== See also ==
- National Register of Historic Places listings in Little Rock, Arkansas
