= Van Frank Cottages =

Historic houses in Arkansas, United States

- U.S. National Register of Historic Places
- Location within Arkansas Location within the United States
- Location: 515-519 E. Fifteenth St. and 1510 Park Ln., Little Rock, Arkansas
- Coordinates: 34°44′0″N 92°16′2″W
- Area: less than one acre
- Built: 1908
- Architectural style: Colonial Revival
- NRHP reference No.: 85003476
- Added to NRHP: October 21, 1985

The Van Frank Cottages are a collection of four small houses at 515-519 East 15th Street and 1510 Park Lane in Little Rock, Arkansas. All are modest single-story single-family buildings with high quality Colonial Revival details. They were built in 1908 for Philip R. Van Frank, a civil engineer who played a major role in the management of the waterways in the Little Rock area, overseeing the construction of locks and dams on the Arkansas and White Rivers. They are the only known buildings associated with Van Frank's life.

The houses were listed on the National Register of Historic Places in 1985.

== See also ==
- National Register of Historic Places listings in Little Rock, Arkansas
