= Trapnall Hall =

Historic house in Arkansas, United States

- U.S. National Register of Historic Places
- U.S. Historic district – Contributing property
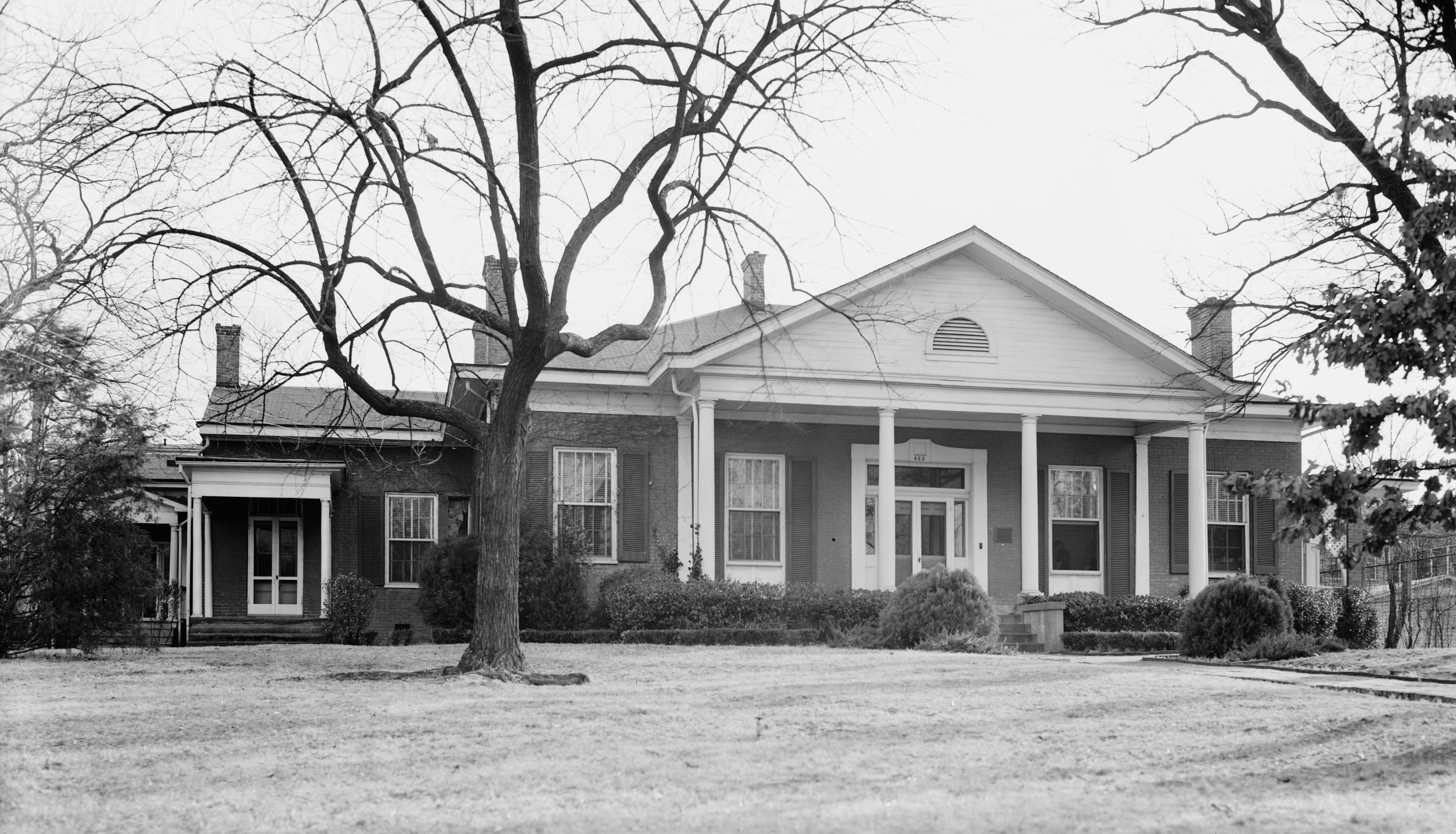
- HABS photo, 1940

- Location within Arkansas Location within the United States
- Location: 423 E. Capitol Ave., Little Rock, Arkansas
- Coordinates: 34°44′35″N 92°15′59″W
- Area: 9.9 acres (4.0 ha)
- Built: 1843
- Architectural style: Greek Revival
- Part of: MacArthur Park Historic District (ID77000269)
- NRHP reference No.: 73000389

Significant dates
- Added to NRHP: April 13, 1973
- Designated CP: July 25, 1977

Trapnall Hall is a historic house at 423 East Capitol Avenue in downtown Little Rock, Arkansas. Built in 1843 for lawyer Frederic Trapnall; one of Arkansas's finest examples of pre-Civil War Greek Revival architecture. It is a single-story brick building, with a hip roof and a projecting temple portico supported by square columns. The building is now owned by the state, which uses it as a venue for public and private events.

The building was listed on the National Register of Historic Places in 1973.

== See also ==
- National Register of Historic Places listings in Little Rock, Arkansas
