= Reichardt House =

Historic house in Arkansas, United States

- U.S. National Register of Historic Places
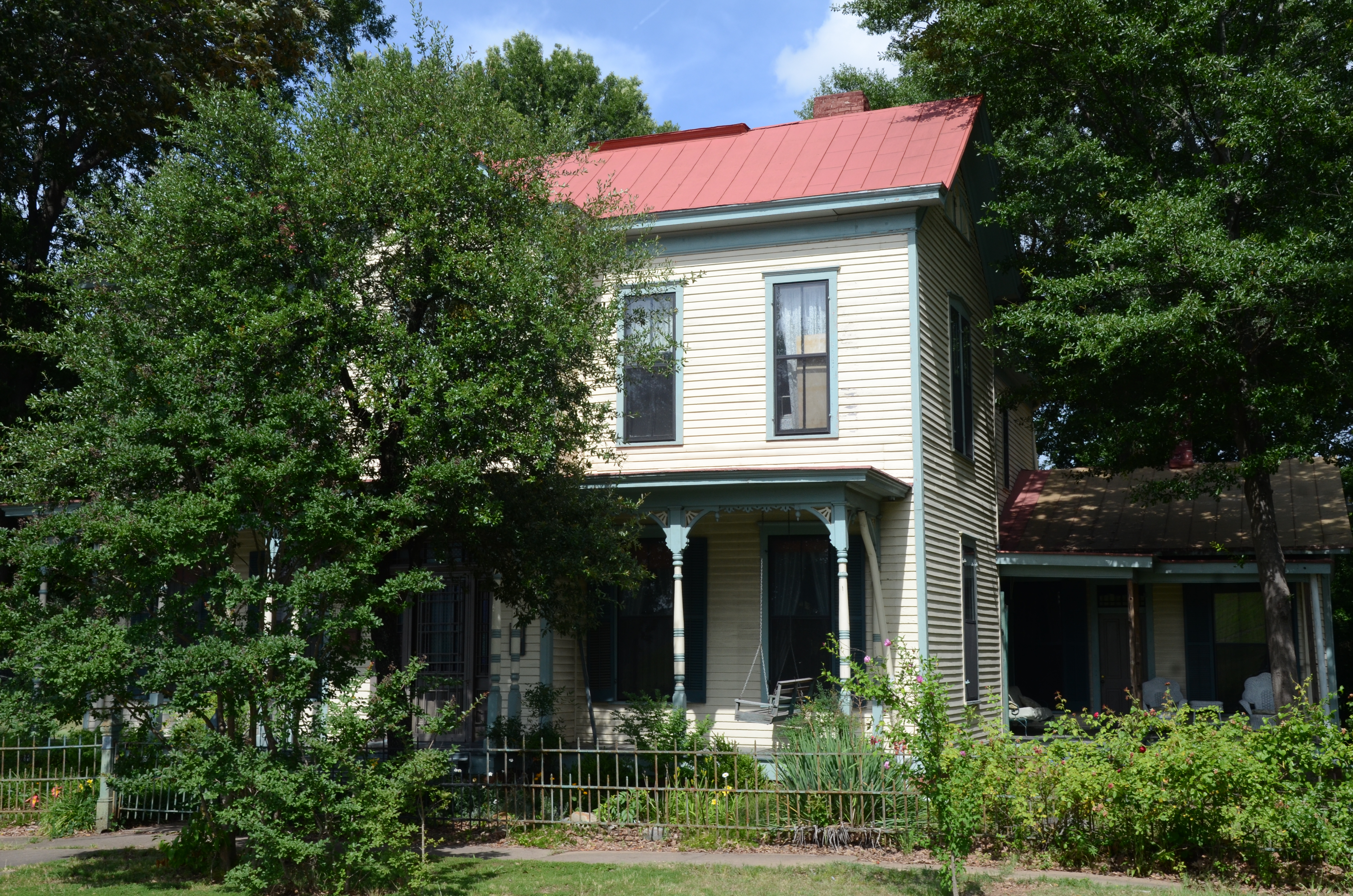

- Location within Arkansas Location within the United States
- Location: 1201 Welch St., Little Rock, Arkansas
- Coordinates: 34°44′9″N 92°15′34″W
- Area: less than one acre
- Built: 1870
- Architectural style: Late Victorian
- NRHP reference No.: 75000410
- Added to NRHP: May 2, 1975

The Reichardt House is a historic house at 1201 Welch Street in Little Rock, Arkansas. Built in 1870 and significantly altered in subsequent decades, it is now a two-story five-bay wood-frame structure, with a side gable roof and weatherboard siding. A central gabled section projects from the front, and a single-story porch wraps across the front, supported by delicate turned posts. The house was built by Edward Reichardt, an early German immigrant to the area.

The house was listed on the National Register of Historic Places in 1975.

== See also ==
- National Register of Historic Places listings in Little Rock, Arkansas
