= St. Peter's Rock Baptist Church =

Historic church in Arkansas, United States

- U.S. National Register of Historic Places
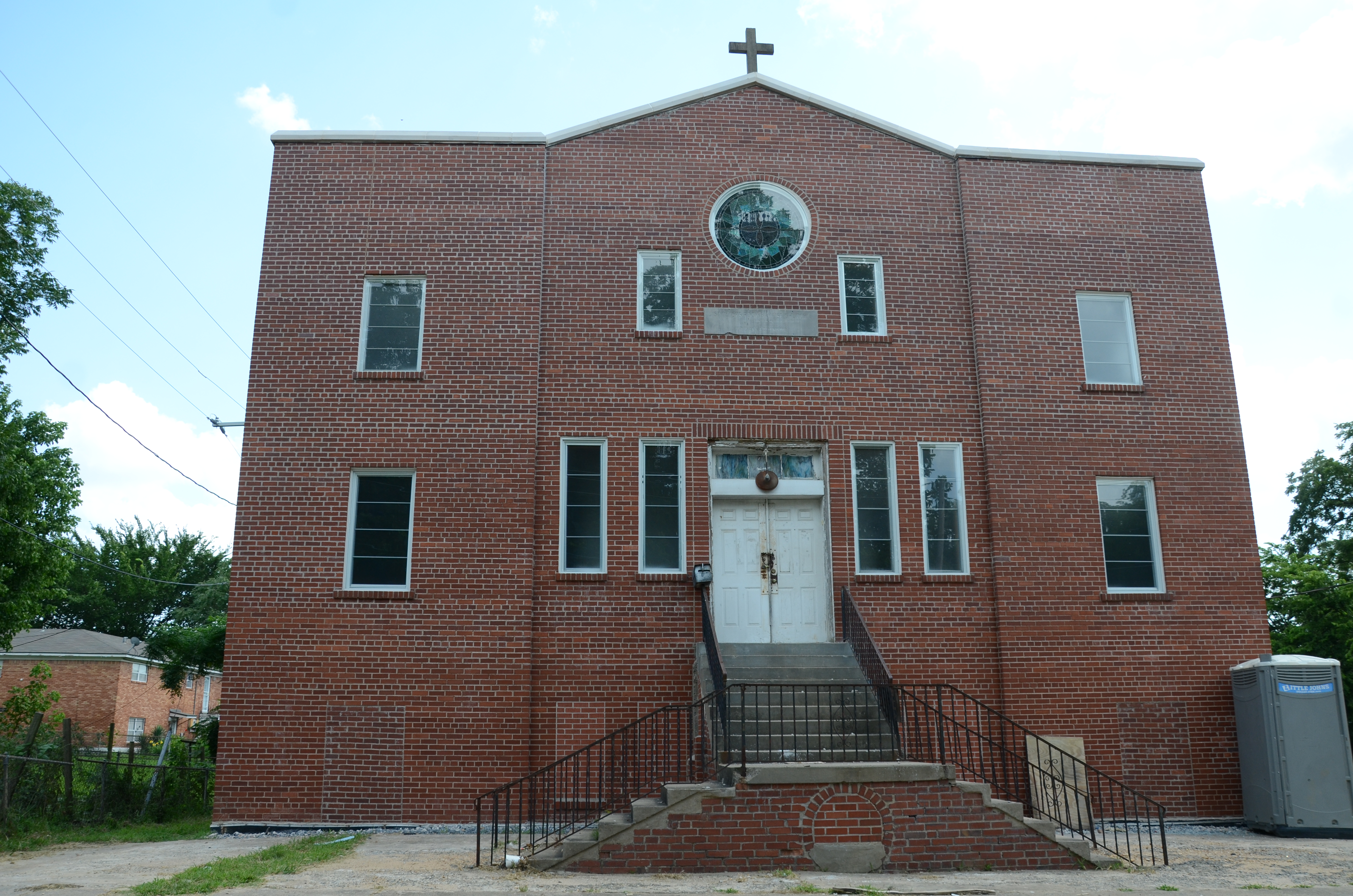

- Location within Arkansas Location within the United States
- Location: 1401 W 18th St., Little Rock, Arkansas
- Coordinates: 34°44′6″N 92°17′19″W
- Area: less than one acre
- Built: 1941
- Architectural style: Plain/traditional
- NRHP reference No.: 04001492
- Added to NRHP: January 20, 2005

St. Peter's Rock Baptist Church is a historic former church building at 1401 West 18th Street in Little Rock, Arkansas. It is a two-story vernacular brick structure, its main facade featuring a slightly recessed central section with a gable topped by a cross above. The church was built in 1941 for an African-American congregation established in the 1890s. This was the congregation's first purpose-built home, which it occupied until moving to larger quarters on Brown Street in 1975. It has been owned since then by the Greater Little Rock Singing Quartet Center, and continues to serve as a community meeting and performance space.

The building was listed on the National Register of Historic Places in 2005.

== See also ==
- National Register of Historic Places listings in Little Rock, Arkansas
