= Arkansas Teachers Association Headquarters Building and Professional Services Building =

- U.S. National Register of Historic Places
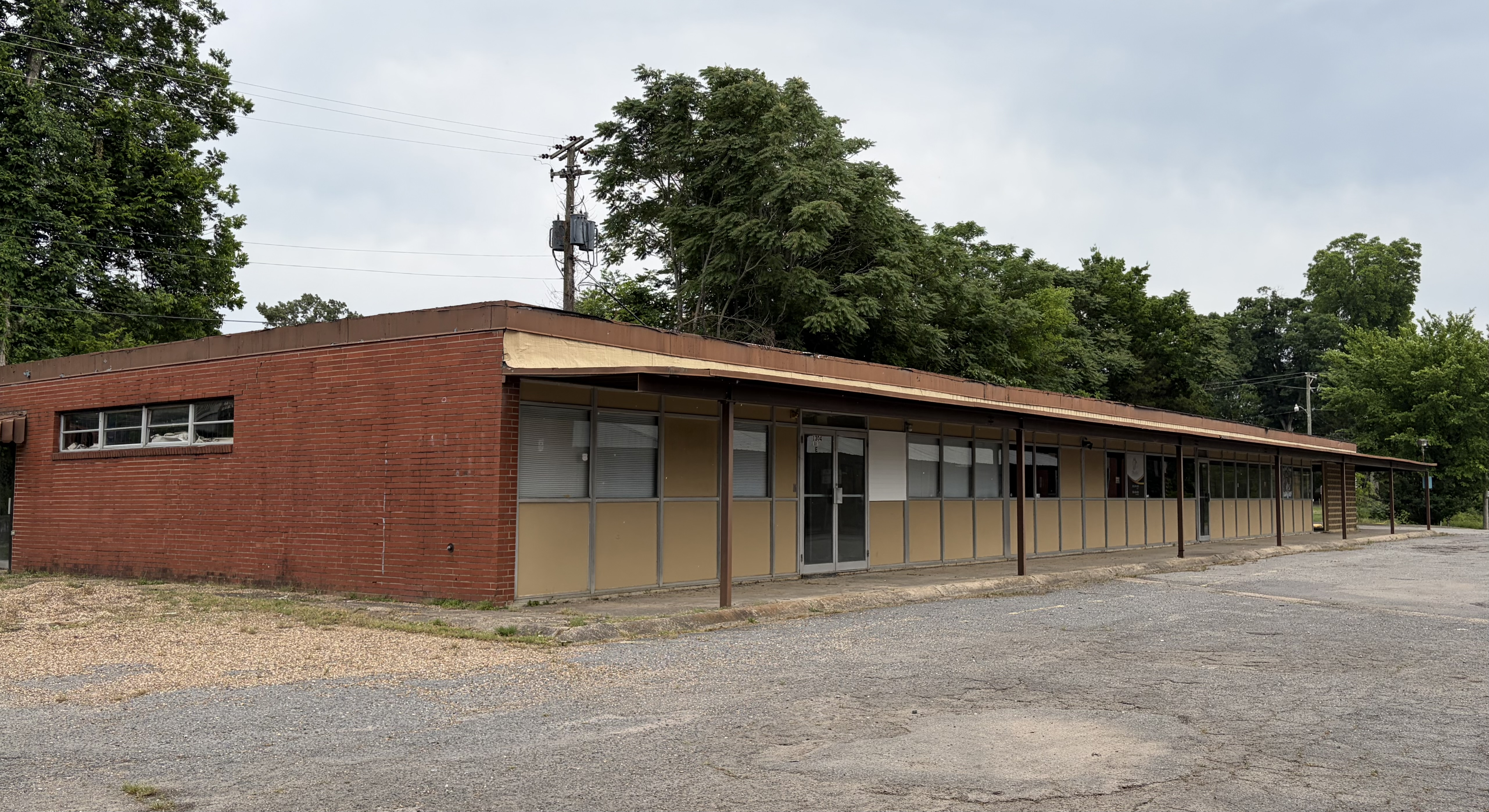
- The former headquarters complex photographed in 2026

- Location within Arkansas Location within the United States
- Location: 1304 and 1306 Wright Ave., Little Rock, Arkansas
- Coordinates: 34°43′55″N 92°17′19″W
- Area: less than one acre
- Built: 1961
- Architect: Geerge Henry Tschiemer & Associates
- Architectural style: International
- NRHP reference No.: 100002002
- Added to NRHP: February 1, 2018

The Arkansas Teachers Association Headquarters Building and Professional Services Building are a pair of historic commercial buildings at 1304 and 1306 Wright Street in Little Rock, Arkansas. Occupying adjacent lots with a shared parking area and landscaping, the two buildings are both single-story brick structures, designed by George Tschiemer & Associates and built in the early 1960s. The buildings were listed as a pair on the National Register of Historic Places in 2018, for the role of the Arkansas Teachers Association, an association of African-American educators, in its work during the Civil Rights Era of the 1960s to end segregation in the state.

== See also ==
- National Register of Historic Places listings in Little Rock, Arkansas
