= Terminal Warehouse Building =

- U.S. National Register of Historic Places
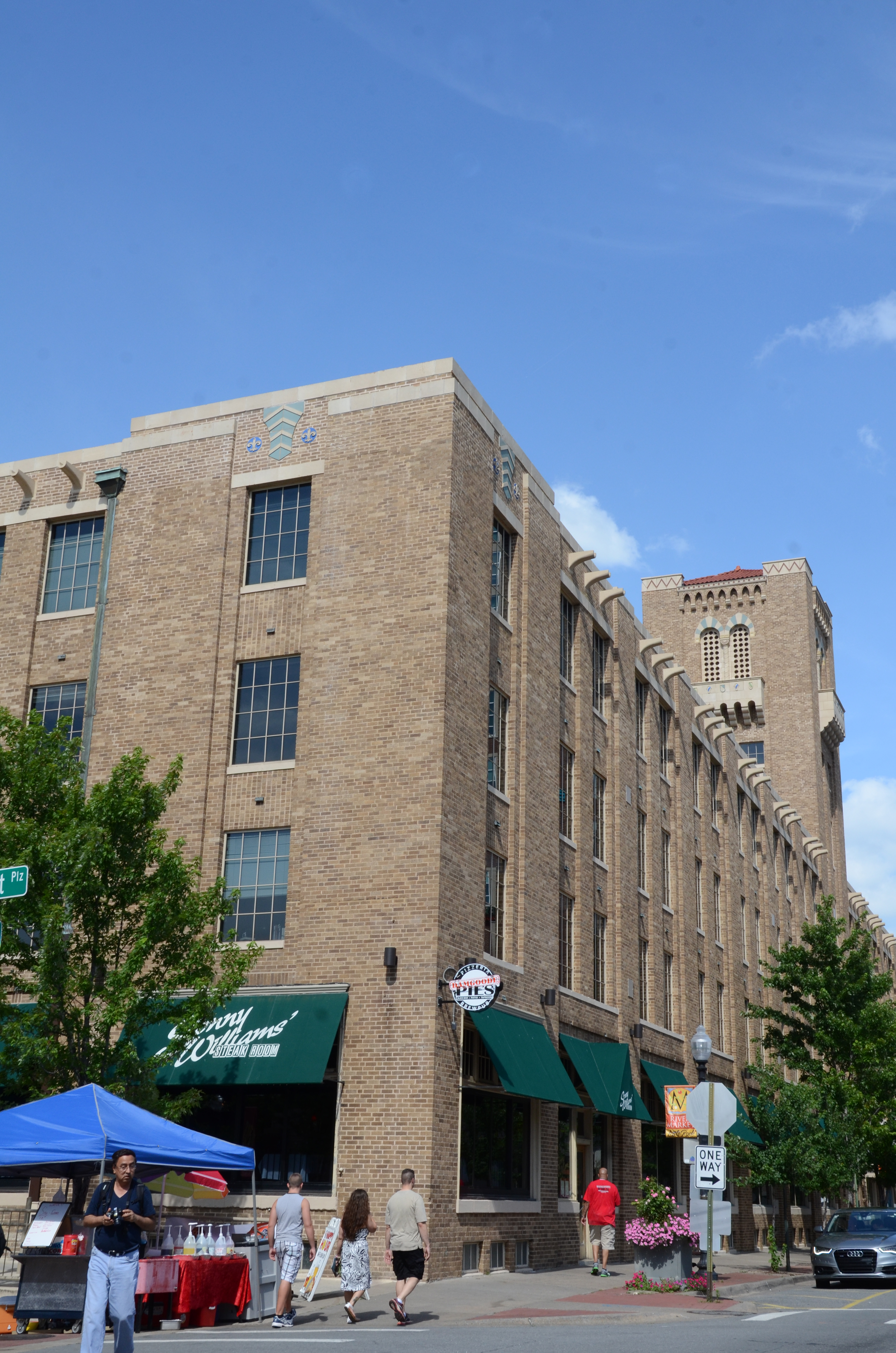

- Location within Arkansas Location within the United States
- Location: 500 E. Markham St., Little Rock, Arkansas
- Coordinates: 34°44′51″N 92°15′53″W
- Area: less than one acre
- Built: 1926
- Architect: Stern, Eugene
- Architectural style: Venetian Gothic
- NRHP reference No.: 82002131
- Added to NRHP: April 29, 1982

The Terminal Warehouse Building, also known as Markham Tower East, is a historic commercial building 500 East Markham Street in downtown Little Rock, Arkansas. Occupying a full city block, it is a massive four-story brick building, with a central eight-story tower on its Markham Street facade. Built in 1926, it is despite its utilitarian use (now as a mixed-use space), a fine example of Venetian Gothic architecture, and a reminder of the city's long history as an important transportation hub.

The building was listed on the National Register of Historic Places in 1982.

== See also ==
- National Register of Historic Places listings in Little Rock, Arkansas
