= Bragg Guesthouse =

Historic house in Arkansas, United States

- U.S. National Register of Historic Places
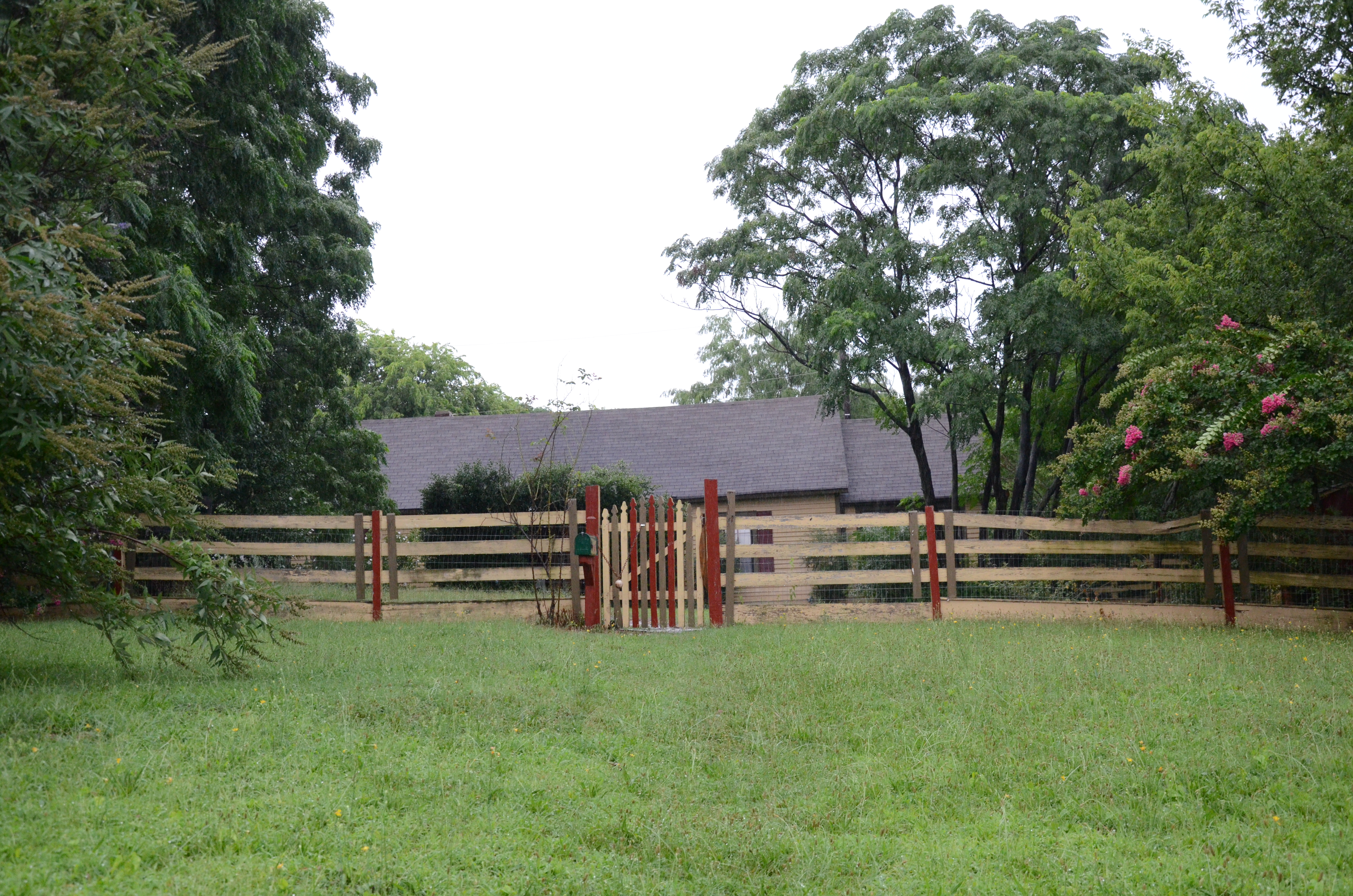

- Location within Arkansas Location within the United States
- Location: 1615 Cumberland, Little Rock, Arkansas
- Coordinates: 34°44′3″N 92°16′14″W
- Area: less than one acre
- Built: 1869
- Architectural style: Colonial Revival
- NRHP reference No.: 00001320
- Added to NRHP: April 4, 2001

The Bragg Guesthouse is a historic house at 1615 Cumberland Street in Little Rock, Arkansas. It is a barn, built in 1869, that was converted about 1925 to serve as a guesthouse for the Bragg family, and represents a fine local example of Colonial Revival architecture. Its structure is post-and-beam timber (cypress) framing, and its exterior is vertical board siding. The interior walls were covered in beaded wood paneling when the conversion was done, but most have since been enclosed in wallboard. The floors are pine throughout.

The house was listed on the National Register of Historic Places in 2001. It had previously been listed on the National Register as a contributing element of the Richard Bragg House, which was delisted after suffering tornado damage.

== See also ==
- National Register of Historic Places listings in Little Rock, Arkansas
