= National Register of Historic Places listings in Little Rock, Arkansas =

Location of Little Rock in Arkansas

This is a list of the National Register of Historic Places listings in Little Rock, Arkansas.

This is intended to be a complete list of the properties and districts on the National Register of Historic Places in Little Rock, Arkansas, United States. The locations of National Register properties and districts for which the latitude and longitude coordinates are included below, may be seen in an online map.

There are 372 properties and districts listed on the National Register in Pulaski County, including 5 National Historic Landmarks, and 23 properties that were once listed but have been removed. The city of Little Rock includes 280 of these properties and districts, of which four are National Historic Landmarks, and 21 of the delisted properties. They are listed here, while the remainder are listed separately.

Contents: Counties in Arkansas
- Arkansas
- Ashley
- Baxter
- Benton
- Boone
- Bradley
- Calhoun
- Carroll
- Chicot
- Clark
- Clay
- Cleburne
- Cleveland
- Columbia
- Conway
- Craighead
- Crawford
- Crittenden
- Cross
- Dallas
- Desha
- Drew
- Faulkner
- Franklin
- Fulton
- Garland
- Grant
- Greene
- Hempstead
- Hot Spring
- Howard
- Independence
- Izard
- Jackson
- Jefferson
- Johnson
- Lafayette
- Lawrence
- Lee
- Lincoln
- Little River
- Logan
- Lonoke
- Madison
- Marion
- Miller
- Mississippi
- Monroe
- Montgomery
- Nevada
- Newton
- Ouachita
- Perry
- Phillips
- Pike
- Poinsett
- Polk
- Pope
- Prairie
- Pulaski (Little Rock)
- Randolph
- St. Francis
- Saline
- Scott
- Searcy
- Sebastian
- Sevier
- Sharp
- Stone
- Union
- Van Buren
- Washington
- White
- Woodruff
- Yell

This National Park Service list is complete through NPS recent listings posted September 25, 2026.

== Current listings ==
	Name on the Register	Image	Date listed	Location	Description
1	Abrams House	Abrams House	February 18, 1999 (#99000221)	300 S. Pulaski St. 34°44′52″N 92°17′06″W	
2	Albert Pike Memorial Temple	Albert Pike Memorial Temple	November 13, 1986 (#86003118)	700-724 Scott St. 34°44′30″N 92°16′14″W	
3	Alexander House		March 24, 2020 (#100004904)	24 East Palisades Dr. 34°46′51″N 92°20′04″W	
4	H.M. Anderson House	H.M. Anderson House	May 2, 2001 (#01000441)	3415 W. Markham; 34°45′03″N 92°18′41″W	
5	Arkansas Power & Light Building	Arkansas Power & Light Building	September 14, 1992 (#92001156)	Junction of 9th St. and Louisiana St. 34°44′24″N 92°16′26″W	
6	Arkansas State Capitol	Arkansas State Capitol	June 28, 1974 (#74000494)	5th and Woodlane Sts. 34°44′48″N 92°17′20″W	
7	Arkansas State Fairgrounds Historic District	Arkansas State Fairgrounds Historic District	January 11, 2022 (#100007315)	2600 Howard St. 34°43′25″N 92°17′52″W	
8	Arkansas State Highway Department Headquarters		January 16, 2024 (#100009769)	10324 Interstate 30; 34°40′16″N 92°22′56″W	
9	Arkansas Teachers Association Headquarters Building and Professional Services Building	Arkansas Teachers Association Headquarters Building and Professional Services Building	February 1, 2018 (#100002002)	1304 and 1306 Wright Ave. 34°43′55″N 92°17′19″W	
10	Arkansas Territorial Restoration Historic District	Arkansas Territorial Restoration Historic District	May 31, 2019 (#100003998)	W. side of Cumberland between 2nd & 3rd Sts. 34°44′47″N 92°16′06″W	Now the Historic Arkansas Museum
11	Asher Avenue Overpass	Asher Avenue Overpass	April 30, 2024 (#100010307)	Asher Avenue between Appian way Street and South Thayer Street; 34°43′54″N 92°18′13″W	
12	Associate Reformed Presbyterian Church	Associate Reformed Presbyterian Church	December 22, 1982 (#82000874)	3323 W. 12th St. 34°44′24″N 92°18′40″W	
13	Baer House	Baer House	December 22, 1982 (#82000876)	1010 Rock St. 34°44′17″N 92°16′06″W	
14	Barlow Apartments	Barlow Apartments	April 7, 1995 (#95000376)	2115 Scott St. 34°43′44″N 92°16′19″W	
15	Daisy Bates House	Daisy Bates House	January 3, 2001 (#01000072)	1207 W. 28th St. 34°43′18″N 92°17′18″W	
16	Beal-Burrow Dry Goods Building	Beal-Burrow Dry Goods Building	June 26, 1995 (#87001546)	107 E. Markham; 34°44′52″N 92°16′10″W	
17	Bechle Apartment Building	Bechle Apartment Building	October 2, 1978 (#78003201)	1000 E. 9th St. 34°44′23″N 92°15′34″W	
18	Beyerlein House	Beyerlein House	December 22, 1982 (#82000878)	412 W. 14th St. 34°44′10″N 92°16′36″W	
19	Gus Blass Department Store	Gus Blass Department Store	November 13, 1986 (#86003122)	318-324 Main St. 34°44′43″N 92°16′16″W	
20	Noland Blass Jr. House		January 24, 2019 (#100003333)	217 Normandy Rd. 34°46′03″N 92°20′40″W	
21	Block 35 Cobblestone Alley	Block 35 Cobblestone Alley	January 22, 2009 (#08001343)	West of the northern end of Rock St. 34°44′50″N 92°16′02″W	
22	Block Realty Building	Block Realty Building	November 30, 2018 (#100002950)	723 W Markham St. 34°44′57″N 92°16′42″W	
23	Block Realty-Baker House	Block Realty-Baker House	September 24, 2008 (#08000935)	1900 Beechwood St. 34°46′09″N 92°19′28″W	
24	Bishop Hiram A. Boaz House	Bishop Hiram A. Boaz House	March 7, 1994 (#94000142)	22 Armistead Rd. 34°46′00″N 92°19′22″W	
25	Boone House	Boone House	December 22, 1982 (#82000879)	4014 Lookout; 34°45′48″N 92°19′06″W	
26	Boyle Park	Boyle Park	September 22, 1995 (#95001119)	Roughly bounded by 38th St., Dorchester Dr., Covewood Cir., Glenmere Dr., Kanis Rd., and W. 12th St. 34°43′35″N 92°21′21″W	
27	BPOE Elks Club	BPOE Elks Club	December 22, 1982 (#82000880)	4th and Scott Sts. 34°44′44″N 92°16′09″W	
28	Bragg Guesthouse	Bragg Guesthouse	April 4, 2001 (#00001320)	1615 Cumberland; 34°44′03″N 92°16′14″W	
29	Richard and Eleanor Bragg House	Richard and Eleanor Bragg House	February 22, 2023 (#100008566)	305 East 16th St. 34°43′59″N 92°16′14″W	
30	Adrian Brewer Studio	Adrian Brewer Studio	February 10, 2000 (#00000069)	510 Cedar St. 34°45′25″N 92°19′01″W	
31	Broadmoor Neighborhood Historic District		January 7, 2022 (#100007316)	Subdivision located west of South University Ave., southeast of Boyle Park Rd., and north of West 32nd St. 34°43′39″N 92°20′53″W	
32	Buhler House	Buhler House	April 25, 1988 (#88000433)	1820 Fair Park Boulevard; 34°44′38″N 92°20′05″W	
33	Bush-Dubisson House	Bush-Dubisson House	May 28, 1999 (#99000549)	1500 S. Ringo St. 34°44′08″N 92°17′01″W	
34	Calvary Cemetery, Historic Section	Calvary Cemetery, Historic Section	August 31, 2022 (#100007766)	Southwest corner of Charles Bussey Ave. (20th St.) and Woodrow St. 34°43′58″N 92°18′22″W	
35	Capital Hotel	Capital Hotel	July 30, 1974 (#74000495)	117 W. Markham St. 34°44′53″N 92°16′16″W	
36	Capitol-Main Historic District	Capitol-Main Historic District	April 2, 2012 (#11001050)	500 block of Main St., 100-200 blocks of W. Capitol Ave., 500 block of Center St., and 100-200 blocks of W. 6th St.; also 609 and 615 Main Street; 34°44′38″N 92°16′21″W	Second set of addresses represent a boundary increase approved April 30, 2024.
37	Capitol View Neighborhood Historic District	Capitol View Neighborhood Historic District	March 13, 2001 (#00000813)	Roughly bounded by Riverview Dr., Schiller St., W. 7th St., and Woodrow St. 34°44′56″N 92°17′55″W	
38	Central High School Neighborhood Historic District	Central High School Neighborhood Historic District	August 16, 1996 (#96000892)	Roughly bounded by MLK Dr., Thayer Ave., W. 12th St., and Roosevelt Rd.; also 1850 S. Park St.; also roughly bounded by W. 17th St., Dr. Martin Luther King, Jr., Dr., Wright Ave., and S. Summit and S. Battery Sts. 34°43′56″N 92°17′43″W	Second and third sets of boundaries represent boundary increases of January 17, 1997 and June 4, 2012
39	Central Presbyterian Church	Central Presbyterian Church	December 22, 1982 (#82000881)	1921 Arch St. 34°43′47″N 92°16′45″W	
40	Chicago, Rock Island & Pacific Railway Overpass		September 5, 2024 (#100010829)	Hilaro Springs Road over Fourche Creek; 34°39′27″N 92°19′20″W	
41	Chisum House	Chisum House	December 4, 1975 (#75000403)	1320 Cumberland; 34°44′07″N 92°16′13″W	
42	Choctaw Route Station	Choctaw Route Station	May 6, 1975 (#75000404)	E. 3rd at the former Rock Island railroad line 34°44′44″N 92°15′32″W	
43	John Henry Clayborn House	John Henry Clayborn House	May 24, 2006 (#06000420)	1800 Marshall; 34°44′07″N 92°17′32″W	
44	Climber Motor Car Factory, Unit A	Climber Motor Car Factory, Unit A	June 1, 2005 (#05000500)	1823 E. 17th St. 34°43′56″N 92°14′56″W	
45	Compton-Wood House	Compton-Wood House	May 7, 1980 (#80000781)	800 High St. 34°44′36″N 92°17′21″W	
46	Confederate Soldiers Monument	Confederate Soldiers Monument	April 26, 1996 (#96000453)	Along 4th St. on the eastern side of the State Capitol grounds 34°44′50″N 92°17′16″W	
47	Cornish House	Cornish House	December 22, 1982 (#82000882)	1800 Arch St. 34°43′52″N 92°16′47″W	
48	Croxson House	Croxson House	December 22, 1982 (#82000883)	1901 Gaines St. 34°43′49″N 92°16′50″W	
49	Cumberland Towers	Cumberland Towers	March 7, 2017 (#100000706)	311 E. 8th St. 34°44′27″N 92°16′09″W	
50	Curran Hall	Curran Hall	January 1, 1976 (#76000453)	615 E. Capitol St. 34°44′34″N 92°15′53″W	
51	Darragh Building	Darragh Building	September 7, 2017 (#100000557)	1403 E. 6th Ave. 34°44′30″N 92°15′18″W	
52	Darragh House	Darragh House	December 22, 1982 (#82000884)	2412 Broadway; 34°43′29″N 92°16′44″W	
53	Julian Bunn Davidson House	Julian Bunn Davidson House	March 10, 2014 (#13001105)	410 S. Battery St. 34°44′50″N 92°17′38″W	
54	Deane House	Deane House	September 5, 1975 (#75000405)	1701 Arch St. 34°43′59″N 92°16′44″W	
55	Democrat Printing & Lithograph Co. Building	Democrat Printing & Lithograph Co. Building	December 17, 1998 (#87001547)	114-122 E. 2nd St. 34°44′50″N 92°16′10″W	
56	David O. Dodd Memorial	David O. Dodd Memorial	April 26, 1996 (#96000454)	300 W. Markham St. 34°44′56″N 92°16′19″W	
57	Donaghey Building	Donaghey Building	June 27, 2012 (#12000355)	103 E. 7th St., 703 S. Main St. 34°44′31″N 92°16′16″W	
58	Downs Historic District		January 21, 2020 (#100004903)	4206, 4208, 4210, 4212, 4214, 4216 & 4218 Fairview Rd.; 4201 South Lookout Rd; and 4207, 4209, 4211 & 4213 Wait St. 34°45′40″N 92°19′11″W	
59	Dunaway House	Dunaway House	December 22, 1982 (#82000885)	2022 Battery; 34°43′46″N 92°17′39″W	
60	Dunbar Junior and Senior High School and Junior College	Dunbar Junior and Senior High School and Junior College	August 6, 1980 (#80000782)	1100 Wright Ave. 34°43′57″N 92°17′10″W	
61	Paul Laurence Dunbar School Neighborhood Historic District	Paul Laurence Dunbar School Neighborhood Historic District	September 27, 2013 (#13000789)	Roughly bounded by Wright Ave., S. Chester, S. Ringo & W. 24th Sts. 34°43′44″N 92°17′07″W	Historically Black Properties in Little Rock's Dunbar School Neighborhood MPS
62	East Markham Street Historic District	East Markham Street Historic District	May 5, 1999 (#99000522)	301-303, 305-307, 313, and 323 East Markham St. 34°44′50″N 92°16′03″W	
63	Empire Life Insurance Company of America Building	Empire Life Insurance Company of America Building	May 30, 2019 (#100004002)	2801 W. Roosevelt Rd. 34°43′31″N 92°18′21″W	
64	England House	England House	December 22, 1982 (#82000886)	2121 Arch St. 34°43′41″N 92°16′46″W	
65	Esso Standard Oil Service Station	Esso Standard Oil Service Station	January 8, 2016 (#15000287)	1600 W. 3rd St. 34°44′55″N 92°17′21″W	
66	Exchange Bank Building	Exchange Bank Building	October 23, 1986 (#86002896)	423 Main St. 34°44′45″N 92°16′15″W	
67	Fair Park Golf Course		September 16, 2020 (#100005596)	5511 West Markham St. 34°45′07″N 92°20′09″W	
68	Farrell House	Farrell House	December 22, 1982 (#82000889)	2121 Louisiana; 34°43′40″N 92°16′29″W	
69	Farrell House	Farrell House	December 22, 1982 (#82000888)	2115 Louisiana; 34°43′41″N 92°16′28″W	
70	Farrell House	Farrell House	December 22, 1982 (#82000887)	2111 Louisiana; 34°43′42″N 92°16′29″W	
71	Farrell House	Farrell House	October 11, 1984 (#84000103)	2109 Louisiana; 34°43′41″N 92°16′28″W	
72	Federal Building	Federal Building	May 5, 2015 (#15000206)	700 W. Capitol Ave. 34°44′43″N 92°16′44″W	
73	Federal Reserve Bank Building	Federal Reserve Bank Building	October 23, 1986 (#86002895)	123 W. 3rd St. 34°44′45″N 92°16′15″W	
74	First Baptist Church	First Baptist Church	August 9, 1994 (#94000823)	Southwestern corner of the junction of 12th and Louisiana Sts. 34°44′14″N 92°16′26″W	
75	First Church of Christ, Scientist	First Church of Christ, Scientist	October 4, 1984 (#84000008)	20th and Louisiana Sts. 34°43′46″N 92°16′30″W	
76	First Hotze House	First Hotze House	September 20, 2006 (#06000828)	1620 S. Main St. 34°44′04″N 92°16′26″W	
77	First Missionary Baptist Church	First Missionary Baptist Church	September 29, 1983 (#83001164)	701 S. Gaines St. 34°44′35″N 92°16′41″W	
78	First Presbyterian Church	First Presbyterian Church	November 13, 1986 (#86003124)	123 E. 8th St. 34°44′26″N 92°16′15″W	
79	First United Methodist Church	First United Methodist Church	October 9, 1986 (#86002845)	723 Center St. 34°44′30″N 92°16′25″W	
80	Fletcher House	Fletcher House	December 22, 1982 (#82000890)	909 Cumberland St. 34°44′21″N 92°16′08″W	
81	Florence Crittenton Home	Florence Crittenton Home	December 22, 1982 (#82000891)	3600 W. 11th St. 34°44′30″N 92°18′53″W	
82	Fones House	Fones House	August 19, 1975 (#75000406)	902 W. 2nd St. 34°44′55″N 92°16′48″W	
83	Fordyce House	Fordyce House	August 6, 1975 (#75000407)	2115 S. Broadway; 34°43′40″N 92°16′41″W	
84	Absalom Fowler House	Absalom Fowler House	June 4, 1973 (#73000387)	502 E. 7th St. 34°44′30″N 92°16′41″W	
85	Joseph M. Frank House	Joseph M. Frank House	October 3, 1985 (#85002716)	912 W. 4th 34°45′02″N 92°16′41″W	
86	Franke-Watson House		June 16, 2021 (#100006528)	30 Edgehill Rd. 34°46′05″N 92°19′10″W	
87	Frauenthal House	Frauenthal House	December 22, 1982 (#82000895)	2008 Arch St. 34°43′45″N 92°16′48″W	
88	French-England House	French-England House	December 22, 1982 (#82000896)	1700 Broadway; 34°43′58″N 92°16′42″W	
89	Abraham and Mollie Froug House	Abraham and Mollie Froug House	May 11, 2022 (#100007716)	1727 Center St. 34°43′54″N 92°16′34″W	
90	Fulk Building	Fulk Building	November 13, 1986 (#86003121)	300 Main St. 34°44′45″N 92°16′16″W	
91	Fulk-Arkansas Democrat Building	Fulk-Arkansas Democrat Building	May 18, 2018 (#100002456)	613-615 Main St. 34°44′34″N 92°16′17″W	
92	Solomon Gans House	Solomon Gans House	March 29, 1984 (#84000905)	1010 W. 3rd St. 34°44′52″N 92°16′54″W	
93	Garland Elementary School	Garland Elementary School	October 16, 2018 (#100003015)	3615 W 25th St. 34°43′43″N 92°18′52″W	
94	Augustus Garland House	Augustus Garland House	June 10, 1975 (#75000408)	1404 Scott St. 34°44′05″N 92°16′19″W	
95	Gay Oil Company Building	Gay Oil Company Building	June 5, 2017 (#100001011)	300 S. Broadway St. 34°44′48″N 92°16′32″W	
96	Gazette Building	Gazette Building	October 22, 1976 (#76002239)	112 W. 3rd St. 34°44′47″N 92°16′18″W	
97	Gibson & Company's Blue Star/ Horizon Home		May 5, 2025 (#100011826)	7012 Shamrock Drive; 34°45′17″N 92°21′09″W	
98	Governor's Mansion Historic District	Governor's Mansion Historic District	September 13, 1978 (#78000620)	Bounded by the mansion grounds and 13th, Center, Gaines, and 18th Sts.; also roughly bounded by Louisiana St., 23rd St., Roosevelt Rd., Chester and State Sts., and 13th and 12th Sts.; also roughly along Louisiana Ave. from W. 23rd St. and 24th St. 34°44′02″N 92°16′39″W	Second and third sets of boundaries represent boundary increases of May 19, 1988 and February 15, 2002
99	Thomas Gray House		September 18, 2018 (#100002955)	25 River Valley Rd. 34°47′26″N 92°22′56″W	
100	Green House	Green House	May 28, 1999 (#99000544)	1224 W. 21st St. 34°43′45″N 92°17′16″W	
101	Hall House	Hall House	December 22, 1982 (#82000897)	32 Edgehill; 34°46′04″N 92°19′04″W	
102	Halliburton Townhouses	Halliburton Townhouses	December 12, 1976 (#76000455)	1601 and 1605 Center St. 34°44′01″N 92°16′31″W	
103	Hanger Hill Historic District	Hanger Hill Historic District	January 30, 2008 (#07001466)	1500 block of Welch St. 34°43′57″N 92°15′33″W	
104	Frederick Hanger House	Frederick Hanger House	March 15, 1974 (#74000496)	1010 Scott St. 34°44′18″N 92°16′30″W	
105	Hardy House	Hardy House	December 22, 1982 (#82000898)	2400 Broadway; 34°43′31″N 92°16′44″W	
106	Harris House	Harris House	June 3, 1998 (#98000644)	6507 Fourche Dam Pike; 34°43′16″N 92°11′52″W	
107	Healey and Roth Mortuary Building	Healey and Roth Mortuary Building	December 22, 1982 (#82000899)	815 Main; 34°44′26″N 92°16′17″W	
108	Hemingway House	Hemingway House	December 22, 1982 (#82000900)	1720 Arch St. 34°43′57″N 92°16′46″W	
109	Henderson House	Henderson House	May 28, 1999 (#99000548)	1510 S. Ringo St. 34°44′08″N 92°17′02″W	
110	Herschell-Spillman Carousel	Herschell-Spillman Carousel	December 1, 1989 (#89002065)	War Memorial Park midway 34°44′54″N 92°19′48″W	
111	Hillcrest Historic District	Hillcrest Historic District	December 18, 1990 (#90001920)	Bounded by Woodrow, Jackson, and Markham Sts. and N. Lookout Rd.; also roughly bounded by Evergreen, Harrison, Lee, and Jackson Sts. 34°45′23″N 92°19′03″W	Second set of boundaries represents a boundary increase of October 8, 1992
112	Holcomb Court Apartments	Holcomb Court Apartments	April 7, 1995 (#95000377)	2201 Main St. 34°43′39″N 92°16′24″W	
113	Isaac Homard House	Isaac Homard House	March 27, 2017 (#100000777)	1217 W. 3rd St. 34°44′53″N 92°17′04″W	
114	Hornibrook House	Hornibrook House	July 30, 1974 (#74000497)	2120 S. Louisiana St. 34°43′40″N 92°16′30″W	
115	Hotel Freiderica	Hotel Freiderica	September 27, 2003 (#03000951)	625 W. Capitol Ave. 34°44′41″N 92°16′40″W	
116	Hotze House	Hotze House	August 11, 1975 (#75000409)	1619 Louisiana St. 34°43′58″N 92°16′27″W	
117	Johnson House	Johnson House	December 22, 1982 (#82000902)	514 E. 8th St. 34°44′26″N 92°15′58″W	
118	Johnson House	Johnson House	December 22, 1982 (#82000903)	516 E. 8th St. 34°44′26″N 92°15′57″W	
119	Johnson House	Johnson House	December 22, 1982 (#82000904)	518 E. 8th St. 34°44′26″N 92°15′56″W	
120	Robert H. and Martha Johnson Hous		May 5, 2025 (#100011831)	5026 E. Crestwood Drive; 34°45′55″N 92°19′45″W	
121	Johnswood	Johnswood	May 20, 1994 (#94000495)	10314 Cantrell Rd. 34°47′17″N 92°23′16″W	
122	Scipio A. Jones House	Scipio A. Jones House	May 28, 1999 (#99000545)	1872 S. Cross St. 34°43′52″N 92°17′13″W	
123	Kahn-Jennings House	Kahn-Jennings House	September 8, 1992 (#92001223)	5300 Sherwood St. 34°45′54″N 92°19′56″W	
124	Keith House	Keith House	December 22, 1982 (#82000905)	2200 Broadway; 34°43′38″N 92°16′43″W	
125	Gustave B. Kleinschmidt House	Gustave B. Kleinschmidt House	June 7, 2016 (#16000319)	621 E. 16th St. 34°43′57″N 92°15′59″W	
126	Werner Knoop House	Werner Knoop House	August 3, 1990 (#90001147)	6 Ozark Point; 34°45′20″N 92°18′18″W	
127	LaFayette Hotel	LaFayette Hotel	September 30, 1982 (#82002128)	525 S. Louisiana St. 34°44′36″N 92°16′20″W	
128	Lake Nixon		June 5, 2017 (#100001013)	18500 Cooper Orbit Rd. 34°43′05″N 92°26′02″W	
129	Lamb-McSwain House	Lamb-McSwain House	June 4, 1998 (#98000621)	2124 Rice St. 34°43′45″N 92°18′03″W	
130	William Laporte Building	William Laporte Building	May 19, 2023 (#100008975)	1924 Commerce St. 34°43′47″N 92°16′08″W	
131	Robert E. Lee School	Robert E. Lee School	June 2, 2009 (#09000370)	3805 W. 12th St. 34°44′24″N 92°18′58″W	
132	Leiper-Scott House	Leiper-Scott House	May 1, 1980 (#80000783)	312 S. Pulaski St. 34°44′51″N 92°17′06″W	
133	Lincoln Avenue Viaduct	Lincoln Avenue Viaduct	April 9, 1990 (#90000731)	Highway 10, over a Missouri Pacific railroad line 34°45′09″N 92°16′59″W	
134	Lincoln Building	Lincoln Building	August 5, 1994 (#94000826)	1423-1425 S. Main St. 34°44′04″N 92°16′21″W	
135	Little Rock Boys Club	Little Rock Boys Club	December 22, 1982 (#82000906)	8th and Scott Sts. 34°44′26″N 92°16′12″W	
136	Little Rock Central Fire Station	Little Rock Central Fire Station	October 18, 1979 (#79000451)	520 W. Markham St. 34°44′57″N 92°16′32″W	
137	Little Rock High School	Little Rock High School	August 19, 1977 (#77000268)	14th and Park Sts. 34°44′12″N 92°17′55″W	
138	Little Rock Central High School National Historic Site	Little Rock Central High School National Historic Site	November 6, 1998 (#01000274)	2125 Daisy L. Gatson Dr. 34°44′12″N 92°17′55″W	
139	Little Rock City Hall	Little Rock City Hall	October 18, 1979 (#79000452)	500 W. Markham St. 34°44′57″N 92°16′31″W	
140	Little Rock Confederate Memorial	Little Rock Confederate Memorial	May 3, 1996 (#96000499)	Little Rock National Cemetery at the junction of 21st and Barber Sts. 34°43′39″N 92°15′40″W	
141	Little Rock Fire Station No. 9	Little Rock Fire Station No. 9	September 14, 2020 (#100005587)	2023 East 6th St. 34°44′31″N 92°14′49″W	
142	Little Rock National Cemetery	Little Rock National Cemetery	December 20, 1996 (#96001496)	2523 Confederate Boulevard; 34°43′30″N 92°15′33″W	
143	Little Rock US Post Office and Courthouse	Little Rock US Post Office and Courthouse	December 23, 1999 (#99001540)	600 W. Capitol Ave. 34°44′43″N 92°15′59″W	
144	Little Rock Y.M.C.A.	Little Rock Y.M.C.A.	July 22, 1979 (#79000456)	524 Broadway St. 34°44′39″N 92°16′33″W	
145	The Little Rock	The Little Rock	October 6, 1970 (#70000124)	On the southern bank of the Arkansas River at the foot of Rock St. 34°41′11″N 92°23′38″W	
146	Luxor Apartments	Luxor Apartments	April 7, 1995 (#95000375)	1923 Main St. 34°43′47″N 92°16′24″W	
147	MacArthur Park Historic District	MacArthur Park Historic District	July 25, 1977 (#77000269)	Roughly bounded by Ferry, McGowan, McAlmont, 16th, Bragg, 15th, Scott, 9th, Cumberland, and 5th Sts. 34°44′16″N 92°15′59″W	
148	Magnolia Service Station	Magnolia Service Station	September 27, 2019 (#100004434)	3023 W. 7th St. 34°44′43″N 92°18′27″W	
149	Main Building, Arkansas Baptist College	Main Building, Arkansas Baptist College	April 30, 1976 (#76000457)	1600 High St. 34°44′06″N 92°17′24″W	
150	Main Street Commercial District	Main Street Commercial District	June 25, 2010 (#10000396)	The 300 block of Main St. bounded by East 3rd St. on the north and East 4th St. on the south 34°44′44″N 92°16′15″W	
151	George R. Mann Building	George R. Mann Building	December 29, 1983 (#83003547)	115 E. 5th St. 34°44′37″N 92°16′12″W	
152	Angelo Marre House	Angelo Marre House	June 15, 1970 (#70000128)	1321 Scott St. 34°44′02″N 92°16′04″W	
153	Marshall House	Marshall House	December 22, 1982 (#82000907)	2009 Arch St. 34°43′45″N 92°16′46″W	
154	Marshall Square Historic District	Marshall Square Historic District	August 10, 1979 (#79000453)	Bounded by 17th, McAlmont, 18th, and Vance Sts. 34°43′52″N 92°15′50″W	
155	Martin Cemetery Historic Section		December 13, 2017 (#100001014)	10900 I-30 Frontage Rd. 34°39′52″N 92°23′52″W	
156	Matthews-Storey House	Matthews-Storey House	September 28, 2015 (#15000632)	8115 Ascension Rd. 34°42′27″N 92°22′01″W	
157	Maxwell F. Mayer House	Maxwell F. Mayer House	December 9, 1994 (#94001464)	2016 Battery St. 34°43′47″N 92°17′39″W	
158	McDonald-Wait-Newton House	McDonald-Wait-Newton House	July 14, 1978 (#78000622)	1406 Cantrell Rd. 34°45′12″N 92°17′06″W	
159	Thomas R. McGuire House	Thomas R. McGuire House	December 19, 1991 (#91001858)	114 Rice St. 34°45′00″N 92°17′59″W	
160	McLean House	McLean House	December 22, 1982 (#82000908)	470 Ridgeway; 34°45′14″N 92°18′43″W	
161	Mehaffey House	Mehaffey House	December 22, 1982 (#82000909)	2101 Louisiana; 34°43′42″N 92°16′30″W	
162	Miller House	Miller House	May 28, 1999 (#99000547)	1853 S. Ringo St. 34°43′54″N 92°17′07″W	
163	Mims-Breedlove-Priest-Weatherton House	Mims-Breedlove-Priest-Weatherton House	November 23, 1998 (#98001432)	2108 Beechwood Ave. 34°46′21″N 92°19′28″W	
164	Minnesota Monument	Minnesota Monument	May 3, 1996 (#96000498)	2523 Confederate Boulevard; 34°43′28″N 92°15′25″W	
165	James Mitchell School	James Mitchell School	May 20, 2009 (#09000322)	2410 S. Battery St. 34°43′33″N 92°17′41″W	
166	Monument to Confederate Women	Monument to Confederate Women	April 26, 1996 (#96000452)	State capitol grounds at the junction of W. 7th and Marshall Sts. 34°44′45″N 92°17′20″W	
167	Moore Building	Moore Building	October 23, 1986 (#86002894)	519-523 Center St. 34°44′37″N 92°16′27″W	
168	Moore House	Moore House	December 22, 1982 (#82000911)	20 Armistead; 34°46′00″N 92°19′23″W	
169	Mooshian-Brewer House		January 23, 2024 (#100009788)	4701 N. Lookout Road; 34°45′45″N 92°19′32″W	
170	Mopac Station	Mopac Station	June 17, 1977 (#77000270)	Markham and Victory St. 34°45′01″N 92°17′09″W	
171	Mosaic Templars State Temple	Mosaic Templars State Temple	May 18, 2018 (#100002457)	906 S Broadway St. 34°44′27″N 92°16′36″W	
172	Mount Holly Cemetery	Mount Holly Cemetery	March 5, 1970 (#70000125)	12th St. and Broadway; 34°44′17″N 92°16′42″W	
173	Mount Holly Mausoleum	Mount Holly Mausoleum	December 22, 1982 (#82000912)	12th St. and Broadway; 34°44′17″N 92°16′42″W	
174	Mount Zion Baptist Church	Mount Zion Baptist Church	March 27, 1987 (#86003230)	900 Cross St. 34°44′30″N 92°17′07″W	
175	Nash House	Nash House	December 22, 1982 (#82000913)	409 E. 6th St. 34°44′32″N 92°16′02″W	
176	Nash House	Nash House	December 22, 1982 (#82000914)	601 Rock St. 34°44′32″N 92°16′02″W	
177	National Old Line Insurance Company Building	National Old Line Insurance Company Building	May 29, 2019 (#100003985)	501 Woodlane St. 34°44′45″N 92°17′16″W	
178	Newbill-Porter House		January 12, 2021 (#100006031)	3900 North Lookout St. 34°45′53″N 92°18′56″W	
179	Oak Forest United Methodist Church		January 12, 2021 (#100006032)	2415 Fair Park Blvd. 34°43′46″N 92°20′06″W	
180	Oakland-Fraternal Cemetery	Oakland-Fraternal Cemetery	April 20, 2010 (#09001258)	2101 Barber St. 34°43′43″N 92°15′40″W	
181	Old Post Office Building and Customhouse	Old Post Office Building and Customhouse	May 7, 1973 (#73000388)	2nd and Spring Sts. 34°44′52″N 92°16′24″W	
182	Old State House	Old State House	December 3, 1969 (#69000037)	300 W. Markham St. 34°44′56″N 92°16′19″W	
183	Parnell Hall	Parnell Hall	January 24, 2008 (#07001431)	2400 W. Markham; 34°45′13″N 92°17′55″W	
184	Fred W. Parris Towers	Fred W. Parris Towers	March 7, 2017 (#100000707)	1800 S. Broadway St. 34°43′53″N 92°16′43″W	
185	Pearson-Robinson House	Pearson-Robinson House	July 24, 1978 (#78000623)	1900 Marshall St. 34°43′54″N 92°17′30″W	
186	Peoples Building & Loan Building	Peoples Building & Loan Building	September 2, 1982 (#82002129)	213-217 W. 2nd St. 34°45′08″N 92°16′42″W	
187	Pfeifer Brothers Department Store	Pfeifer Brothers Department Store	May 18, 2000 (#00000464)	522-524 S. Main St. 34°44′34″N 92°16′16″W	
188	Philander Smith College Historic District	Philander Smith College Historic District	September 13, 1999 (#99000229)	Roughly bounded by 13th, 11th, Izard, and State Sts. 34°44′24″N 92°16′55″W	
189	Albert Pike Hotel	Albert Pike Hotel	November 21, 1978 (#78000625)	7th and Scott Sts. 34°44′30″N 92°16′11″W	
190	Pike-Fletcher-Terry House	Pike-Fletcher-Terry House	August 21, 1972 (#72000208)	411 E. 7th St. 34°44′28″N 92°15′53″W	
191	Lamar Porter Athletic Field	Lamar Porter Athletic Field	December 6, 1990 (#90001827)	Junction of Johnson and 7th Sts. 34°44′45″N 92°18′29″W	
192	Jesse Powell Towers	Jesse Powell Towers	March 7, 2017 (#100000708)	1010 Wolfe St. 34°44′28″N 92°17′34″W	
193	Presbyterian Village		September 8, 2020 (#100005589)	510 Brookside Dr. 34°45′28″N 92°22′24″W	
194	Prospect Terrace Apartments	Prospect Terrace Apartments	September 12, 2002 (#02001043)	3603 Kavanaugh Boulevard; 34°45′43″N 92°19′53″W	
195	Pulaski County County Government Marker		September 28, 2026 (#100013438)	Southeast Corner of Broadway and West Markham Street; 34°44′55″N 92°16′30″W	
196	Pulaski County Courthouse	Pulaski County Courthouse	October 18, 1979 (#79000454)	405 W. Markham St. 34°44′57″N 92°16′32″W	
197	Ragland House	Ragland House	June 17, 1977 (#77000271)	1617 Center St. 34°43′59″N 92°16′31″W	
198	Railroad Call Historic District	Railroad Call Historic District	July 9, 1997 (#97000749)	108, 112, and 114 S. Pulaski St.; also 104 South Pulaski St., 1302 and 1304 West 2nd St. 34°44′59″N 92°17′48″W	Second set of addresses represent a boundary increase approved February 15, 2024.
199	Red Carpet Inn	Red Carpet Inn	February 21, 2025 (#100010311)	2020 Vance Street; 34°43′44″N 92°15′55″W	
200	Reichardt House	Reichardt House	May 2, 1975 (#75000410)	1201 Welch St. 34°44′09″N 92°15′34″W	
201	Reid House	Reid House	December 22, 1982 (#82000916)	1425 Kavanaugh St. 34°45′17″N 92°18′30″W	
202	Remmel Apartments	Remmel Apartments	December 22, 1982 (#82000919)	1704-1706 Spring St. 34°43′57″N 92°16′38″W	
203	Remmel Apartments	Remmel Apartments	December 22, 1982 (#82000918)	1708-1710 Spring St. 34°43′56″N 92°16′37″W	
204	Remmel Apartments	Remmel Apartments	December 22, 1982 (#82000917)	409-411 W. 17th St. 34°43′58″N 92°16′40″W	
205	Remmel Flats	Remmel Flats	December 22, 1982 (#82000920)	1700-1702 Spring St. 34°43′58″N 92°16′37″W	
206	Retan House	Retan House	December 22, 1982 (#82000921)	2510 Broadway; 34°43′26″N 92°16′44″W	
207	Albert Retan House	Albert Retan House	December 3, 1980 (#80000784)	506 N. Elm St. 34°45′18″N 92°19′07″W	
208	Reutlinger House	Reutlinger House	June 16, 2021 (#100006527)	2005 South Spring St. 34°43′45″N 92°16′38″W	
209	Joseph Taylor Robinson House	Joseph Taylor Robinson House	August 28, 1975 (#75000411)	2122 Broadway; 34°43′40″N 92°16′44″W	Home of Arkansas governor and U.S. Senator Joseph Taylor Robinson during 1930-1937, the period of his greatest influence
210	Joseph Taylor Robinson Memorial Auditorium	Joseph Taylor Robinson Memorial Auditorium	February 21, 2007 (#07000056)	414 W. Markham; 34°44′57″N 92°16′28″W	
211	Rogers House	Rogers House	December 22, 1982 (#82000922)	400 W. 18th St. 34°43′56″N 92°16′40″W	
212	Roosevelt Road Bridge	Roosevelt Road Bridge	January 16, 2026 (#100012577)	At the intersection of East Roosevelt Road and Barber Street; 34°43′24″N 92°15′34″W	
213	Rose Building	Rose Building	November 13, 1986 (#86003119)	307 Main St. 34°44′43″N 92°16′13″W	
214	U.M. Rose School	U.M. Rose School	December 8, 1988 (#88002820)	Izard and W. 13th St. 34°44′16″N 92°16′54″W	
215	Roselawn Memorial Park Gatehouse	Roselawn Memorial Park Gatehouse	December 22, 1982 (#82000923)	2801 Asher; 34°43′51″N 92°18′16″W	
216	Ross Building	Ross Building	January 24, 2019 (#100003334)	700 S. Schiller St. 34°44′41″N 92°17′46″W	
217	J.P. Runyan House	J.P. Runyan House	August 18, 1992 (#92001067)	1514 S. Schiller; 34°44′09″N 92°17′48″W	
218	Safferstone House	Safferstone House	December 22, 1982 (#82000925)	2205 Arch St. 34°43′38″N 92°16′46″W	
219	Saint Andrews Catholic Cathedral	Saint Andrews Catholic Cathedral	November 13, 1986 (#86003117)	617 Louisiana St. 34°44′33″N 92°16′19″W	
220	St. Edwards Church	St. Edwards Church	December 22, 1982 (#82000929)	823 Sherman; 34°44′23″N 92°15′54″W	
221	St. Peter's Rock Baptist Church	St. Peter's Rock Baptist Church	January 20, 2005 (#04001492)	1401 W. 18th St. 34°44′06″N 92°17′19″W	
222	Sanders House	Sanders House	December 22, 1982 (#82000924)	2100 Gaines St. 34°43′42″N 92°16′52″W	
223	Schaer House	Schaer House	December 22, 1982 (#82000926)	1862 Arch St. 34°43′51″N 92°16′47″W	
224	Shiloh Missionary Baptist Church	Shiloh Missionary Baptist Church	March 24, 2020 (#100004893)	1200 Hanger St. 34°44′11″N 92°15′26″W	
225	Dr. Morgan Smith House	Dr. Morgan Smith House	May 20, 2009 (#09000323)	5110 Stagecoach Rd. 34°42′05″N 92°23′04″W	
226	Snyder House	Snyder House	December 22, 1982 (#82000928)	4004 S. Lookout; 34°45′49″N 92°19′05″W	
227	South Main Street Apartments Historic District	South Main Street Apartments Historic District	April 7, 1995 (#95000378)	2209-2213 Main St. 34°43′37″N 92°16′24″W	
228	South Main Street Commercial Historic District	South Main Street Commercial Historic District	August 31, 2007 (#07000435)	S. Main St. from 12th St. to 17th St. 34°44′05″N 92°16′23″W	
229	South Main Street Residential Historic District	South Main Street Residential Historic District	July 12, 2007 (#07000436)	S. Main St. from 19th St. to 24th St.; also 2006-2008, and 2014 S. Scott, and 114, 116, and 118 E. 21st Sts. 34°43′41″N 92°16′26″W	Second set of boundaries represents a boundary increase of October 17, 2012
230	South Scott Street Historic District	South Scott Street Historic District	November 12, 1999 (#99001297)	Roughly bounded by E. 24th, S. Scott, E. 25th, and South Main Sts. 34°43′55″N 92°16′22″W	
231	Southern Trust Building	Southern Trust Building	September 26, 2013 (#13000790)	221 W. 2nd St. 34°44′50″N 92°16′20″W	
232	Southwestern Bell Headquarters Building	Southwestern Bell Headquarters Building	January 4, 2022 (#100007314)	1111 West Capitol Ave. 34°44′45″N 92°17′00″W	
233	Stebbins and Roberts Office Building and Factory	Stebbins and Roberts Office Building and Factory	October 4, 2016 (#16000682)	1300 E. 6th St. 34°44′31″N 92°15′21″W	
234	Stewart House	Stewart House	December 22, 1982 (#82000930)	1406 Summit St. 34°44′13″N 92°17′43″W	
235	Stifft Station Historic District	Stifft Station Historic District	October 18, 2006 (#06000941)	Bounded by W. Markham, W. 7th, Woodrow, and Martin Sts. 34°45′00″N 92°18′29″W	
236	Dan Stowers Office Building	Dan Stowers Office Building	September 28, 2015 (#15000633)	1516 W. 3rd St. 34°44′55″N 92°17′18″W	
237	Taborian Hall	Taborian Hall	April 29, 1982 (#82002130)	9th and State Sts. 34°44′30″N 92°16′48″W	
238	James W. and Billie Tanner House		January 17, 2025 (#100011314)	12821 Ridgehaven Road; 34°45′50″N 92°25′04″W	
239	The Tavern	The Tavern	March 5, 1970 (#70000126)	214 E. 3rd St. 34°44′47″N 92°15′56″W	
240	Taylor Building	Taylor Building	November 13, 1986 (#86003123)	304 Main St. 34°44′45″N 92°16′16″W	
241	Samuel P. Taylor Service Station	Samuel P. Taylor Service Station	November 29, 2000 (#00001364)	1123 W. 3rd St. 34°44′51″N 92°17′01″W	
242	Ten Mile House	Ten Mile House	June 22, 1970 (#70000129)	6915 Stagecoach Road (Highway 5), Mabelvale; 34°41′12″N 92°23′52″W	
243	Terminal Hotel	Terminal Hotel	November 17, 1978 (#78003200)	Victory and Markham Sts. 34°45′00″N 92°17′08″W	
244	Terminal Warehouse Building	Terminal Warehouse Building	April 29, 1982 (#82002131)	500 E. Markham St. 34°44′51″N 92°15′53″W	
245	William L. Terry House	William L. Terry House	January 1, 1976 (#76000459)	1422 Scott St. 34°44′05″N 92°16′23″W	
246	Ada Thompson Memorial Home	Ada Thompson Memorial Home	August 3, 1977 (#77000272)	2021 S. Main; 34°43′44″N 92°16′24″W	
247	Thornton House	Thornton House	May 28, 1999 (#99000543)	1420 W. 15th St. 34°44′12″N 92°17′20″W	
248	Thurston House	Thurston House	December 22, 1982 (#82000931)	923 Cumberland St. 34°44′20″N 92°16′08″W	
249	Dr. Eugene Towbin House		January 24, 2019 (#100003336)	16 Broadview Dr. 34°45′57″N 92°20′56″W	
250	Tower Building	Tower Building	September 23, 2011 (#11000692)	323 Center St. 34°44′44″N 92°16′24″W	
251	Trapnall Hall	Trapnall Hall	April 13, 1973 (#73000389)	423 E. Capitol Ave. 34°44′35″N 92°15′59″W	
252	Trinity Episcopal Cathedral	Trinity Episcopal Cathedral	May 13, 1976 (#76000460)	310 W. 17th St. 34°43′59″N 92°16′35″W	
253	Trinity Hospital	Trinity Hospital	November 18, 1998 (#98001481)	Junction of Main and 20th Sts. 34°43′46″N 92°16′26″W	
254	Tuf Nut Historic Commercial District	Tuf Nut Historic Commercial District	March 27, 2003 (#99000856)	300-312 S. Rock St. and 423 E. 3rd St; 34°44′42″N 92°15′58″W	
255	Turner House	Turner House	December 22, 1982 (#82000932)	1701 Center St. 34°43′56″N 92°16′31″W	
256	Turner-Ledbetter House	Turner-Ledbetter House	June 18, 1987 (#87000978)	1700 S. Louisiana St. 34°43′57″N 92°16′29″W	
257	U.S. Arsenal Building	U.S. Arsenal Building	July 28, 1970 (#70000127)	MacArthur Park, 9th, and Commerce Sts. 34°44′18″N 92°15′45″W	
258	Union Life Building	Union Life Building	September 25, 1981 (#81000141)	212 Center St. 34°44′49″N 92°16′23″W	
259	University Park Historic District		October 18, 2023 (#100008973)	Roughly bounded by Arthur Dr., West 12th, and South Hughes Sts. 34°44′35″N 92°20′50″W	
260	Van Frank Cottages	Van Frank Cottages	October 21, 1985 (#85003476)	515-519 E. 15th St. and 1510 Park Ln. 34°44′00″N 92°16′02″W	
261	Vanetten House	Vanetten House	December 22, 1982 (#82000933)	1012 Cumberland; 34°44′18″N 92°16′11″W	
262	Vaughan House	Vaughan House	December 22, 1982 (#82000934)	2201 Broadway; 34°43′36″N 92°16′41″W	
263	Vaughn House	Vaughn House	February 18, 1999 (#99000226)	104 Rosetta; 34°44′59″N 92°18′31″W	
264	Veterans Administration Hospital	Veterans Administration Hospital	September 14, 2021 (#100006930)	300 East Roosevelt Rd. 34°43′27″N 92°16′15″W	
265	Vinson House	Vinson House	May 6, 1976 (#76000461)	2123 Broadway; 34°43′39″N 92°16′42″W	
266	Wallace Building	Wallace Building	February 18, 1999 (#99000223)	101-111 Main St. 34°44′52″N 92°16′12″W	
267	Zeb Ward Building	Zeb Ward Building	April 19, 1978 (#78000626)	1001-1003 W. Markham St. 34°44′57″N 92°16′52″W	
268	Ward-Hays House	Ward-Hays House	August 11, 1975 (#75000412)	1008 W. 2nd St. 34°44′56″N 92°16′54″W	
269	Corydon Wassell House	Corydon Wassell House	June 2, 2000 (#00000611)	2005 S. Scott St. 34°43′45″N 92°16′20″W	
270	Charles Clary Waters House	Charles Clary Waters House	August 10, 1979 (#79000455)	2004 W. 22nd St. 34°43′42″N 92°17′37″W	
271	West 7th Street Historic District	West 7th Street Historic District	January 21, 2009 (#08001341)	Portions of the 800-1100 blocks of W. 7th St. 34°44′37″N 92°16′56″W	
272	West 12th Street Overpass	West 12th Street Overpass	January 8, 2025 (#100011295)	West 12th Street over the Union Pacific Railroad Line. 34°44′23″N 92°18′14″W	
273	West 14th Street Overpass	West 14th Street Overpass	January 8, 2025 (#100011296)	West 14th Street over the Union Pacific Railroad Line. 34°44′17″N 92°18′16″W	
274	White-Baucum House	White-Baucum House	February 29, 1980 (#80000785)	201 S. Izard St. 34°44′53″N 92°16′46″W	
275	Williamson House	Williamson House	November 15, 1984 (#84000238)	325 Fairfax St. 34°45′11″N 92°18′28″W	
276	Winchester Auto Store	Winchester Auto Store	January 24, 2019 (#100003337)	323 W. 8th St. 34°44′30″N 92°16′30″W	
277	Winfield Methodist Church	Winfield Methodist Church	December 22, 1982 (#82000935)	1601 Louisiana; 34°43′59″N 92°16′26″W	
278	William Woodruff House	William Woodruff House	March 21, 1989 (#89000173)	1017 E. 8th St. 34°44′24″N 92°15′32″W	
279	Worthen Bank Building	Worthen Bank Building	November 13, 1986 (#86003125)	401 Main St. 34°44′41″N 92°16′13″W	
280	The Worthen Building	The Worthen Building	September 5, 2024 (#100010828)	200 West Capitol Avenue; 34°44′40″N 92°16′24″W	
281	YMCA-Democrat Building	YMCA-Democrat Building	June 11, 1992 (#87001544)	E. Capitol and Scott Sts. 34°44′37″N 92°16′12″W	

== Former listings ==
	Name on the Register	Image	Date listed	Date removed	Location	Description
1	Al-Amin Temple		December 22, 1982 (#82000873)	June 3, 1986	2100 Main St.	Destroyed by fire in November, 1985
2	Back House		December 22, 1982 (#82000875)	March 31, 2000	1523 Cumberland St.	
3	Bechle House		February 8, 1979 (#79000449)	December 28, 2002	1004 E. 9th Street	Destroyed by a tornado in 1999.
4	Richard Bragg House	Richard Bragg House	July 22, 1979 (#79000450)	August 2, 1999	305 E. 16th St.	Severely damaged by a tornado in 1999.
5	Bruner House		April 11, 1977 (#77000267)	September 18, 2013	1415 Cantrell Rd. 34°45′10″N 92°17′05″W	Demolished March 17, 2013
6	Bush House	Bush House	December 22, 1982 (#82000877)	January 8, 2025	1516 Ringo St. 34°44′08″N 92°17′05″W	
7	Center Theater		May 22, 2003 (#03000422)	January 25, 2010	407 S. Main St. 34°44′41″N 92°16′14″W	Demolished in 2009
8	Forrey-Smith Apartments (Ringo Street)		December 22, 1982 (#82000892)	January 14, 2002	409 S. Ringo Street	
9	Forrey-Smith Apartments		December 22, 1982 (#82000894)	June 3, 1986	1017 W. 4th Street	
10	Forrey-Smith Apartments		December 22, 1982 (#82000893)	January 14, 2002	1019 W. 4th Street	
11	Alexander George House		May 28, 1976 (#76000454)	September 17, 1999	1007 E. 2nd St.	
12	Hopkins-Grace House		July 1, 1999 (#99000764)	January 24, 2011	1310 Summit; 34°44′22″N 92°17′41″W	
13	Ish House		January 3, 1978 (#78000621)	May 15, 2003	1600 Scott Street	Destroyed by fire, December 31, 1995.
14	Arthur J. Jones House		January 1, 1976 (#76000456)	January 26, 2006	814 Scott St. 34°44′25″N 92°16′14″W	Delisted due to relocation of the house to South Broadway.
15	Mary H. Matthews Lustron House	Mary H. Matthews Lustron House	May 23, 2014 (#14000249)	September 8, 2020	5021 Maryland Ave. 34°44′38″N 92°19′50″W	Demolished in October, 2019
16	Memorial to Company A, Capitol Guards	Memorial to Company A, Capitol Guards	April 26, 1996 (#96000451)	May 12, 2021	MacArthur Park, roughly bounded by 9th and 17th Sts. between Rock St. and I-30; 34°44′18″N 92°15′54″W	Removed 2020
17	Mitchell House	Mitchell House	December 22, 1982 (#82000910)	May 12, 2021	1415 Spring St. 34°44′06″N 92°16′34″W	
18	Mosaic Templars of America Headquarters Building		April 19, 1990 (#90000634)	September 14, 2005	900 Broadway	Vernacular commercial structure designed by Frank W. Blaisdell. Applied for National Historic Landmark designation. Burned down during restoration March 2, 2005
19	Old Statehouse Square Historic District		August 11, 1976 (#76000458)	August 22, 1979	Roughly bounded by Arkansas River, Arch, Main, and 2nd Sts.	
20	Harry Pettefer House		October 19, 1978 (#78000624)	May 15, 2003	105 E. 24th Street	
21	Second Street Bridge	Second Street Bridge	April 9, 1990 (#90000528)	August 11, 1999	Second St., over the Missouri-Pacific Railroad	
22	Skillern House	Skillern House	December 22, 1982 (#82000927)	May 28, 2010	2522 Arch St. 34°43′25″N 92°16′48″W	Demolished in 2009
23	Womack House	Womack House	May 28, 1999 (#99000546)	January 17, 2023	1867 S. Ringo St. 34°43′52″N 92°17′07″W	

== See also ==
- List of National Historic Landmarks in Arkansas
- National Register of Historic Places listings in Arkansas
