= Lake Nixon =

- U.S. National Register of Historic Places
- Location within Arkansas Location within the United States
- Location: 18500 Cooper Orbit Rd., Little Rock, Arkansas
- Coordinates: 34°43′5″N 92°26′2″W
- Area: 185.5 acres (75.1 ha)
- NRHP reference No.: 100001013
- Added to NRHP: June 5, 2017

Lake Nixon is a private recreation area on Cooper Orbit Road on the southwestern outskirts of Little Rock, Arkansas. The lake is 34 acres (14 ha) in size, with a narrow shape oriented roughly northwest to southeast. The south side of the lake is in a natural state, while the central portion of the north shore has been developed as a summer day camp. The site of the camp was the subject of a ground-breaking civil rights case, Daniel v. Paul, decided by the United States Supreme Court in 1969. The camp was in 1966 a private enterprise offering membership for a low fee ($.25) to whites, but refused to grant memberships to African-Americans. Two African American girls sought admission to the grounds during a heat wave in 1966, and filed suit after they were refused. The Supreme Court ruled that the club constituted a public accommodation under civil rights legislation. This case was key in combatting the use of private clubs as a means for racial discrimination.

The lake and surrounding amenities were listed on the National Register of Historic Places in 2017.

== See also ==
- National Register of Historic Places listings in Little Rock, Arkansas
