= Matthews-Storey House =

Historic house in Arkansas, United States

- Matthews-Story House
- U.S. National Register of Historic Places
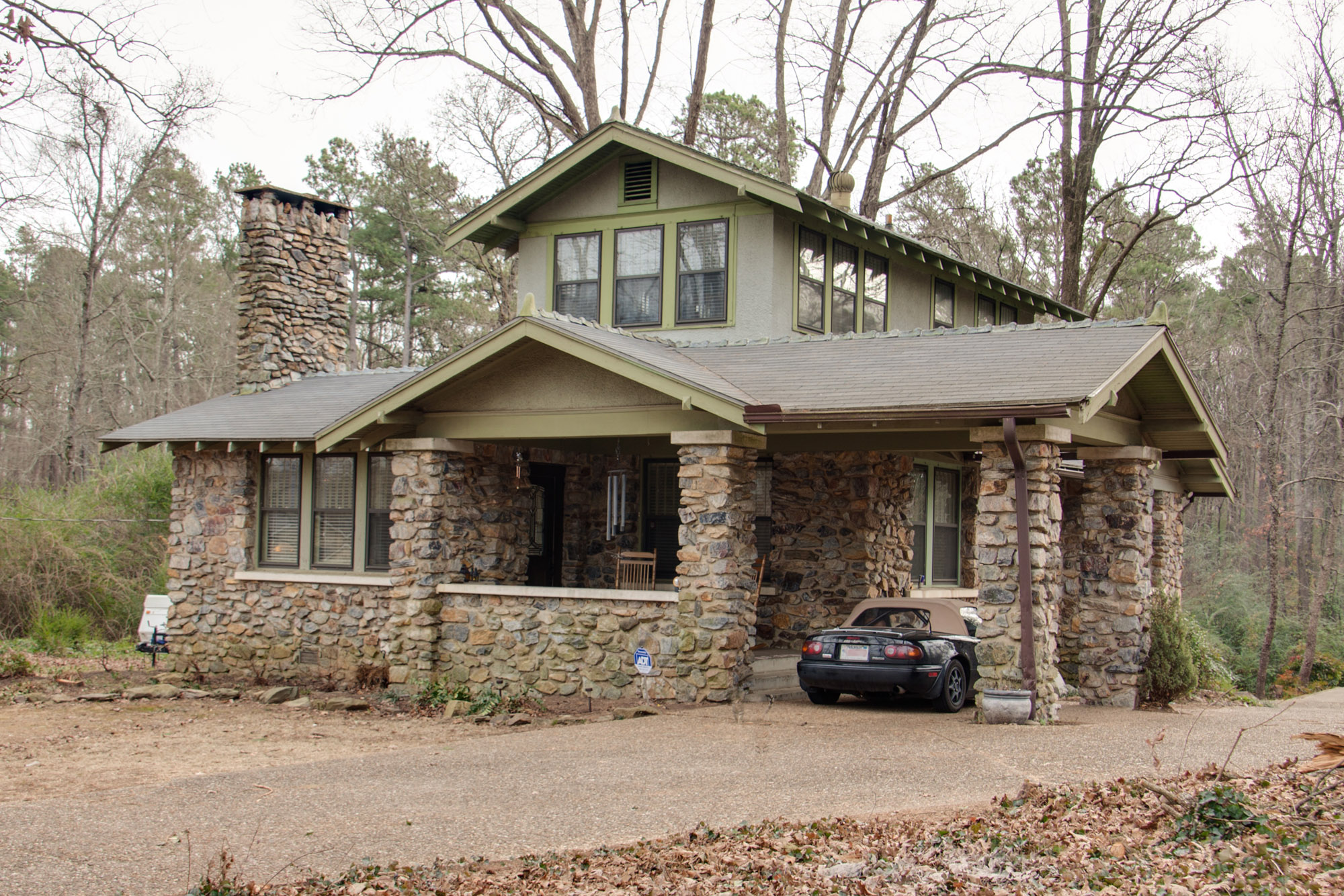

- Location within Arkansas Location within the United States
- Location: 8115 Ascension Rd., Little Rock, Arkansas
- Coordinates: 34°42′27″N 92°22′1″W
- Built: 1925
- Architectural style: Craftsman
- NRHP reference No.: 15000632
- Added to NRHP: September 28, 2015

The Matthews-Storey House is a historic house at 8115 Ascension Road in southern Little Rock, Arkansas. It is a mostly single-story Craftsman Airplane-style structure, in which a small second story at the center makes the building resemble an early aircraft. The building features a carport to the right and a projecting porch to the front, each with supporting stone pillars and exposed rafters underneath. The house was built in 1925 by the Justin Matthews Company, a major developer in the city at that time.

The house was listed on the National Register of Historic Places in 2015.

== See also ==
- National Register of Historic Places listings in Little Rock, Arkansas
