= Chisum House =

Historic house in Arkansas, United States

- U.S. National Register of Historic Places
- U.S. Historic district – Contributing property
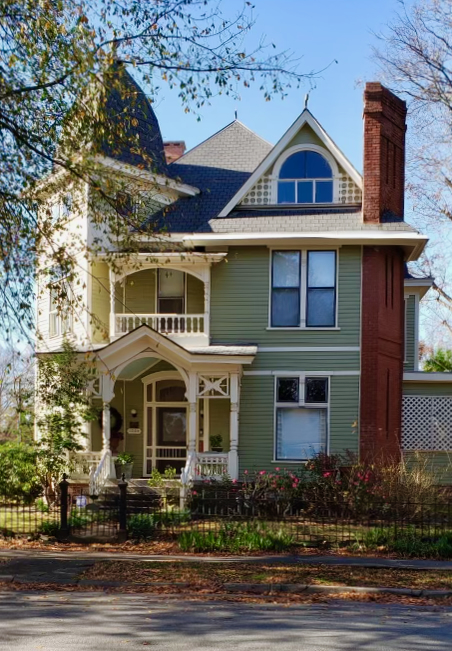

- Location within Arkansas Location within the United States
- Location: 1320 Cumberland, Little Rock, Arkansas
- Coordinates: 34°44′7″N 92°16′13″W
- Area: less than one acre
- Built: 1894
- Architectural style: Queen Anne
- Part of: MacArthur Park Historic District (ID77000269)
- NRHP reference No.: 75000403

Significant dates
- Added to NRHP: December 4, 1975
- Designated CP: July 25, 1977

The Chisum House is a historic house at 1320 South Cumberland Street in Little Rock, Arkansas. It is a two-story frame structure, with a hip roof and an exterior sheathed in clapboards and decorative cut shingles. The roof is capped by a pair of finials, and there is a three-story square tower angled at one corner, topped by a bellcast roof and finial. The design is varied in the Queen Anne style, with multiple sizes and configurations of windows and porches, the latter featuring turned woodwork. Built in 1894, it is one of the city's relatively few Queen Anne Victorians. It was built for Jason Sowell, one of the city's leading families, in what was then Little Rock's most exclusive neighborhood.

The house was listed on the National Register of Historic Places in 1975.

== See also ==
- National Register of Historic Places listings in Little Rock, Arkansas
