= Wittenberg, Delony & Davidson =

American architectural firm

Wittenberg & Delony Wittenberg, Delony & Davidson WDD Architects

Practice information
- Partners: George H. Wittenberg AIA; Lawson L. Delony AIA; Julian B. Davidson AIA, Gordon G. Wittenberg FAIA; Thomas A. Gray FAIA; Jack See FAIA; Tom Adams AIA, Richard Alderman AIA, Chad Young AIA
- Founders: Wittenberg and Delony
- Founded: 1919
- Location: Little Rock, Arkansas

Website
- wddarchitects.com

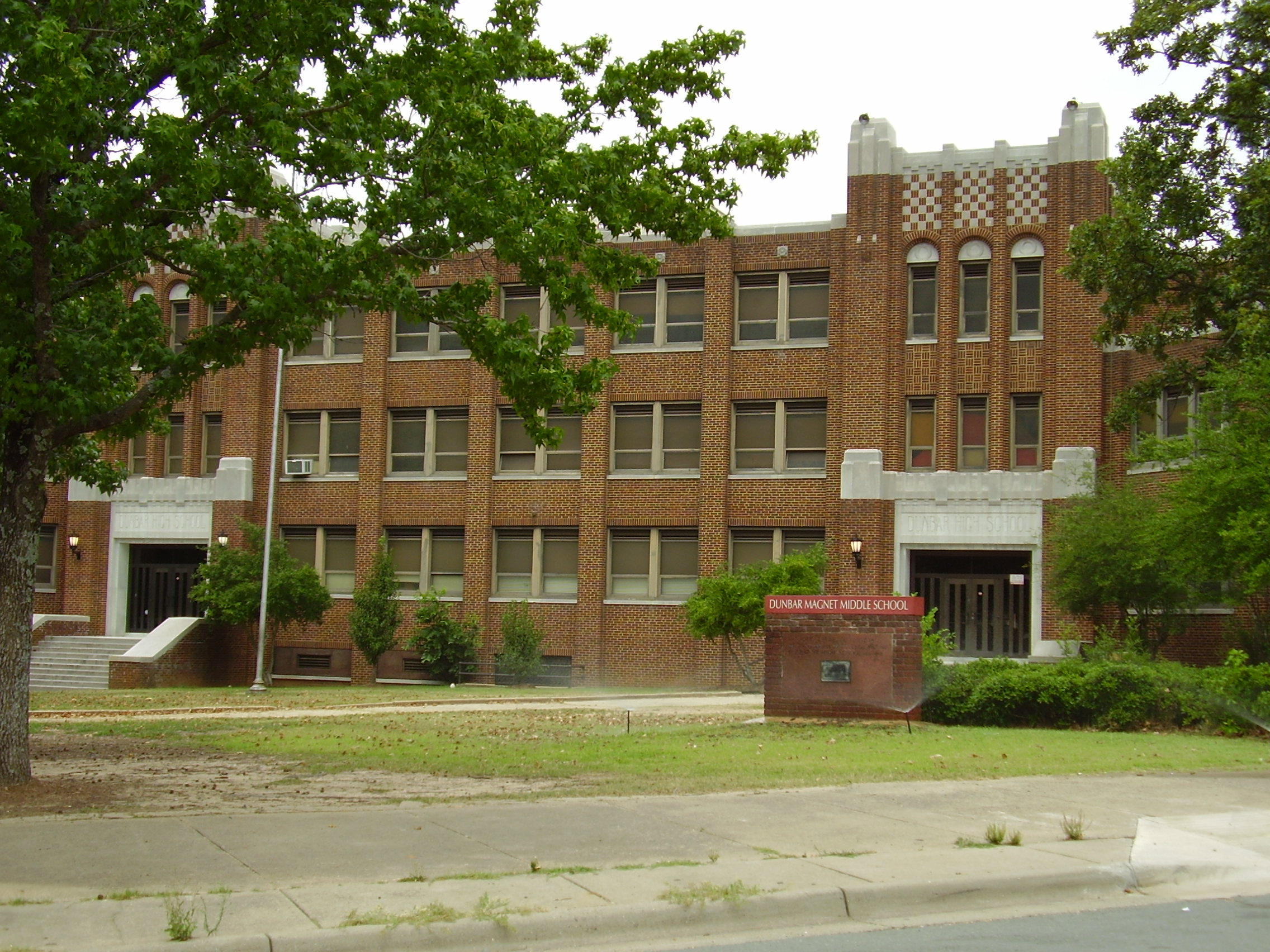
The former Dunbar Junior and Senior High School and Junior College in Little Rock, designed by Wittenberg & Delony and completed in 1929.

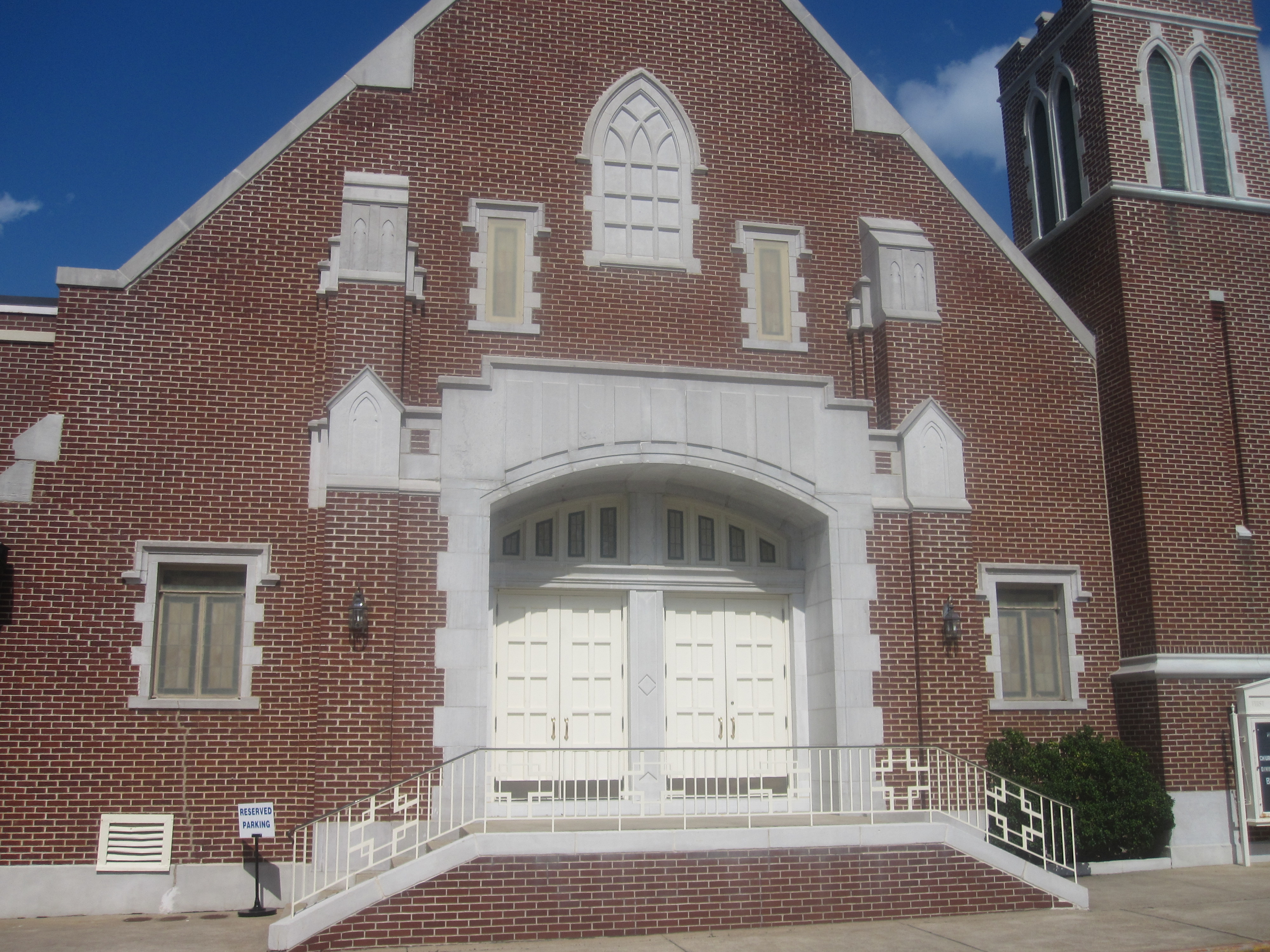
The First United Methodist Church in Camden, designed by Wittenberg & Delony and completed in 1932.

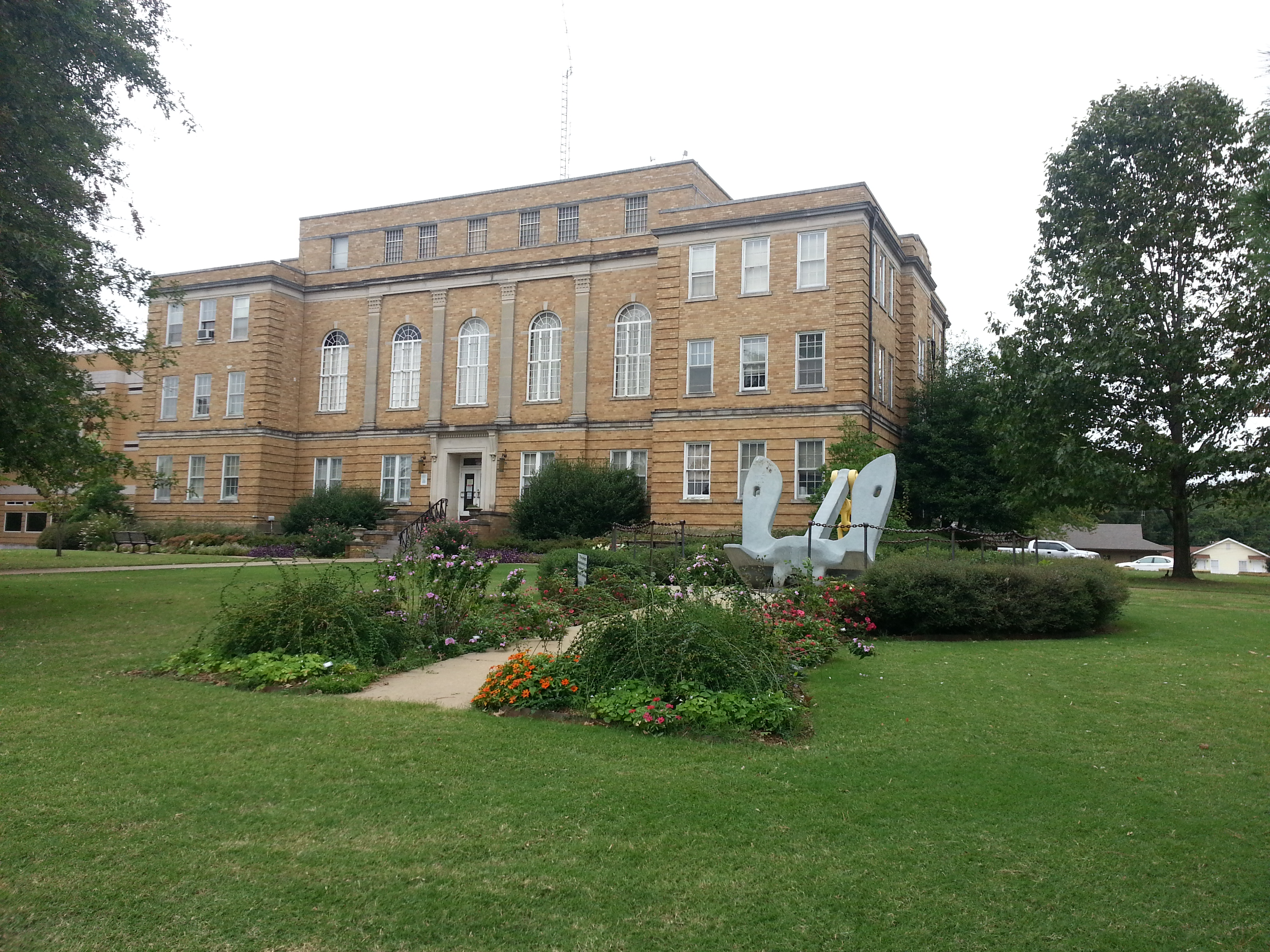
The Faulkner County Courthouse in Conway, designed by Wittenberg & Delony and completed in 1936.

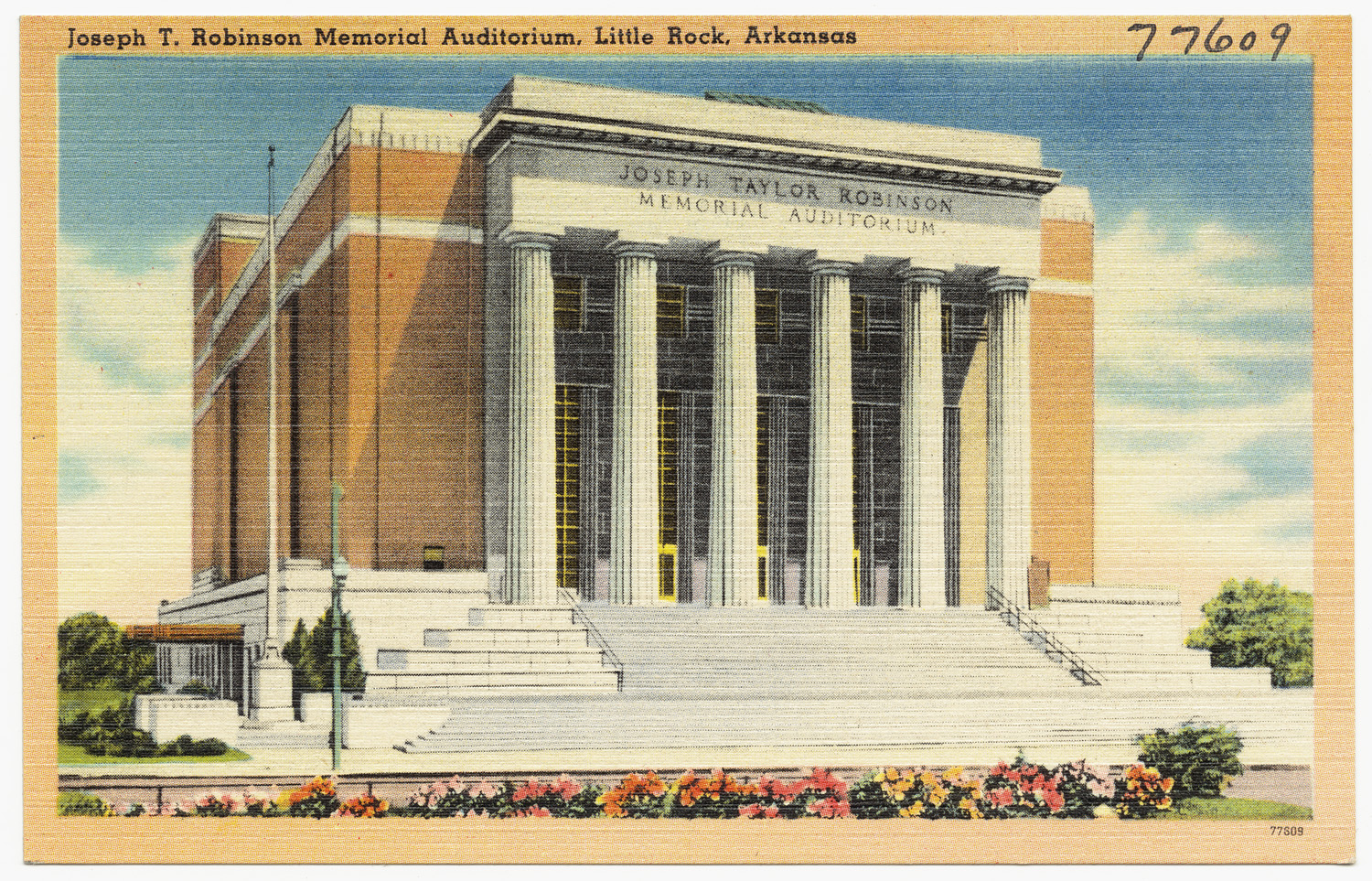
The Robinson Center in Little Rock, designed by associated architects Eugene J. Stern and Wittenberg & Delony and completed in 1939.

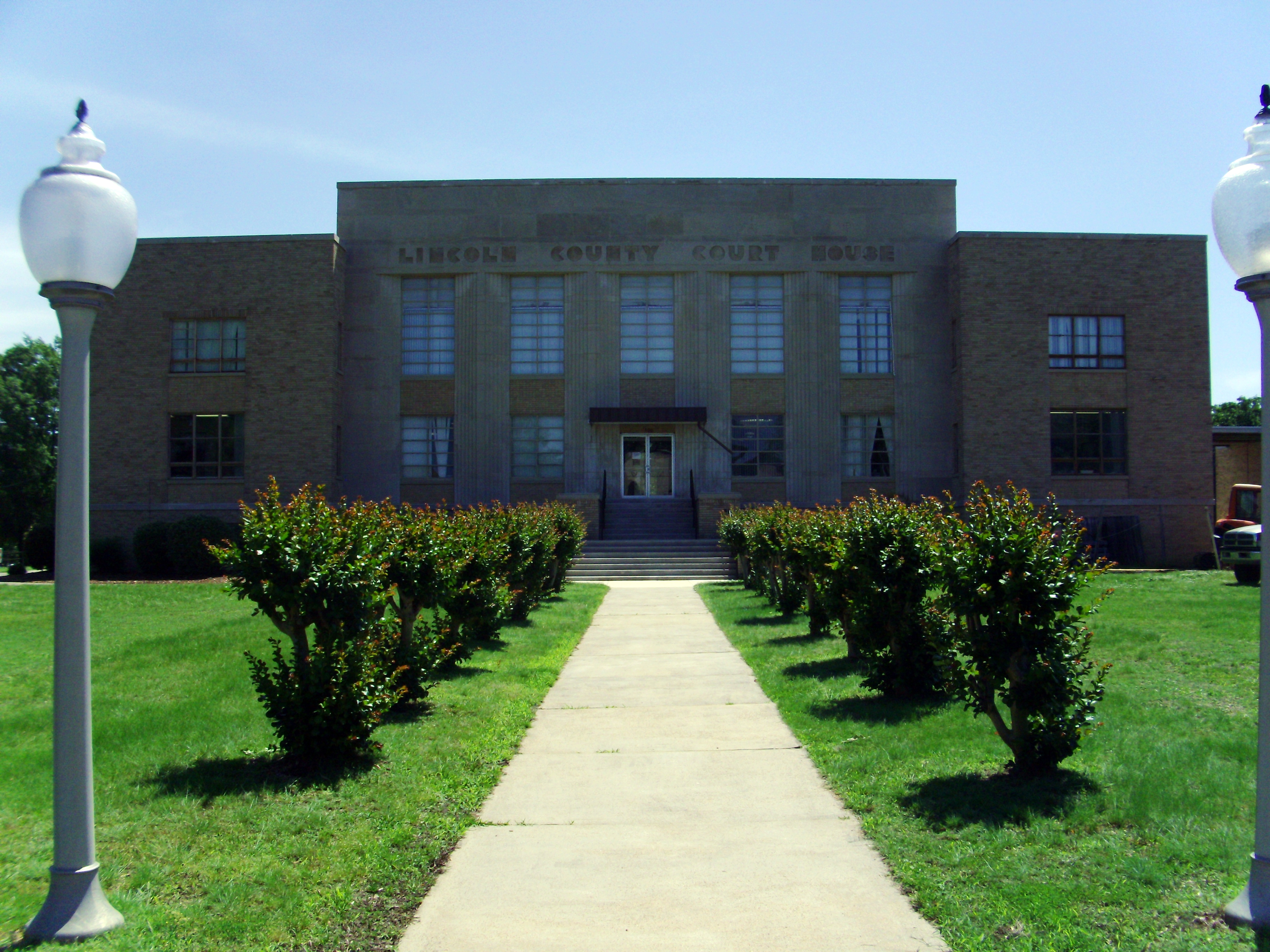
The Lincoln County Courthouse in Star City, designed by Wittenberg & Delony and completed in 1943.

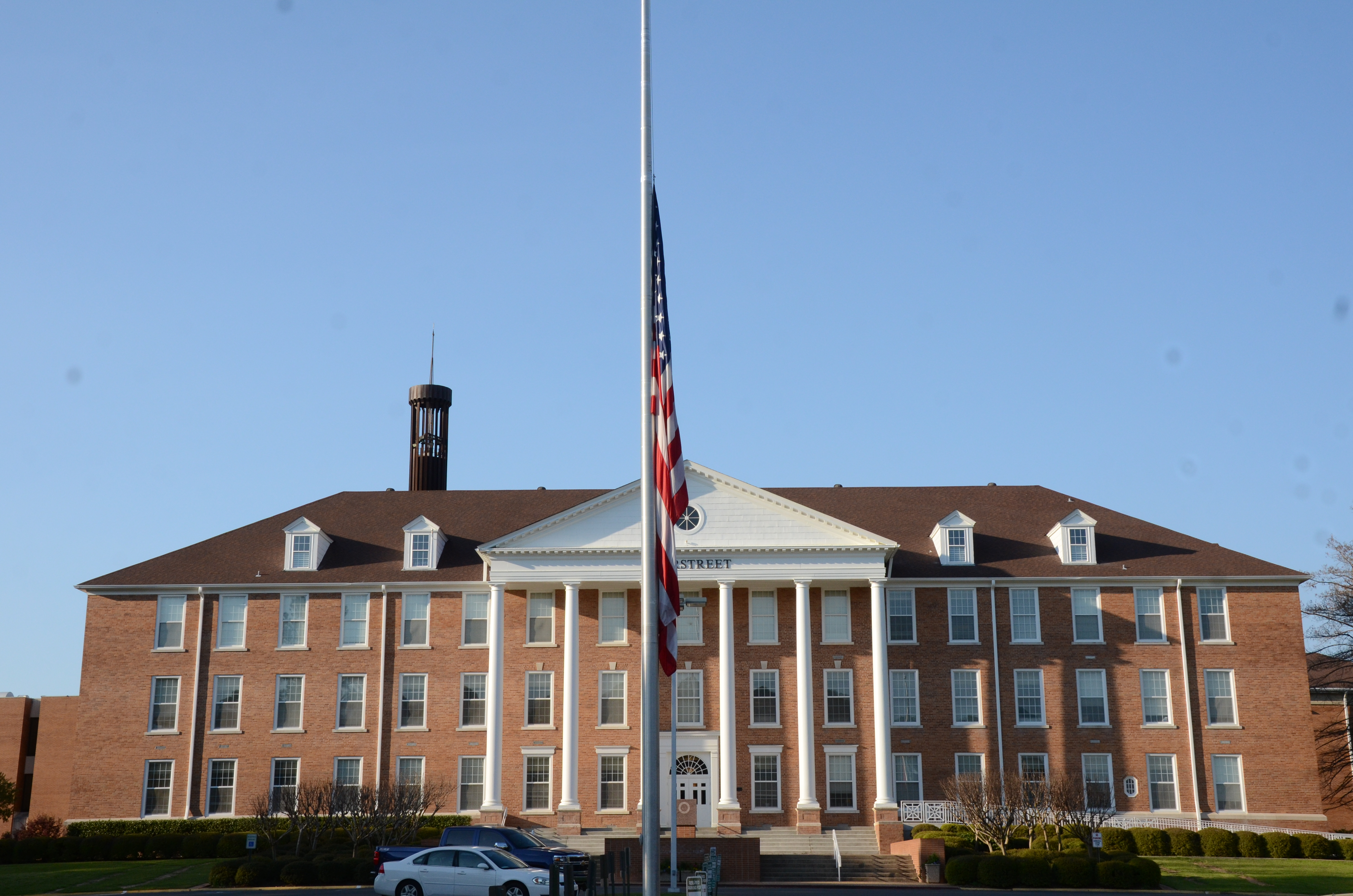
Overstreet Hall of Southern Arkansas University, designed by Wittenberg & Delony and completed in 1943.

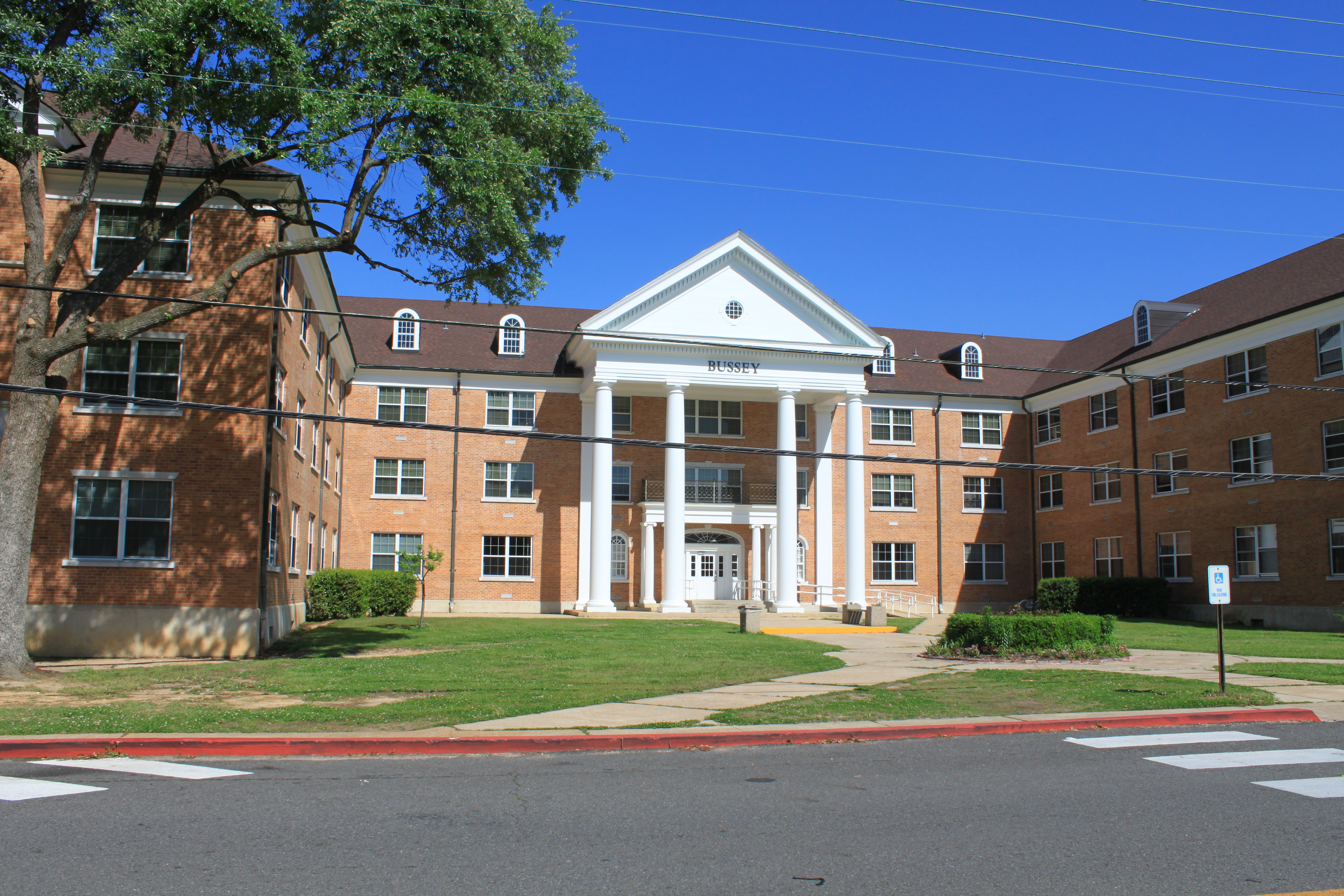
Bussey Hall of Southern Arkansas University, designed by Wittenberg, Delony & Davidson and completed in 1950.

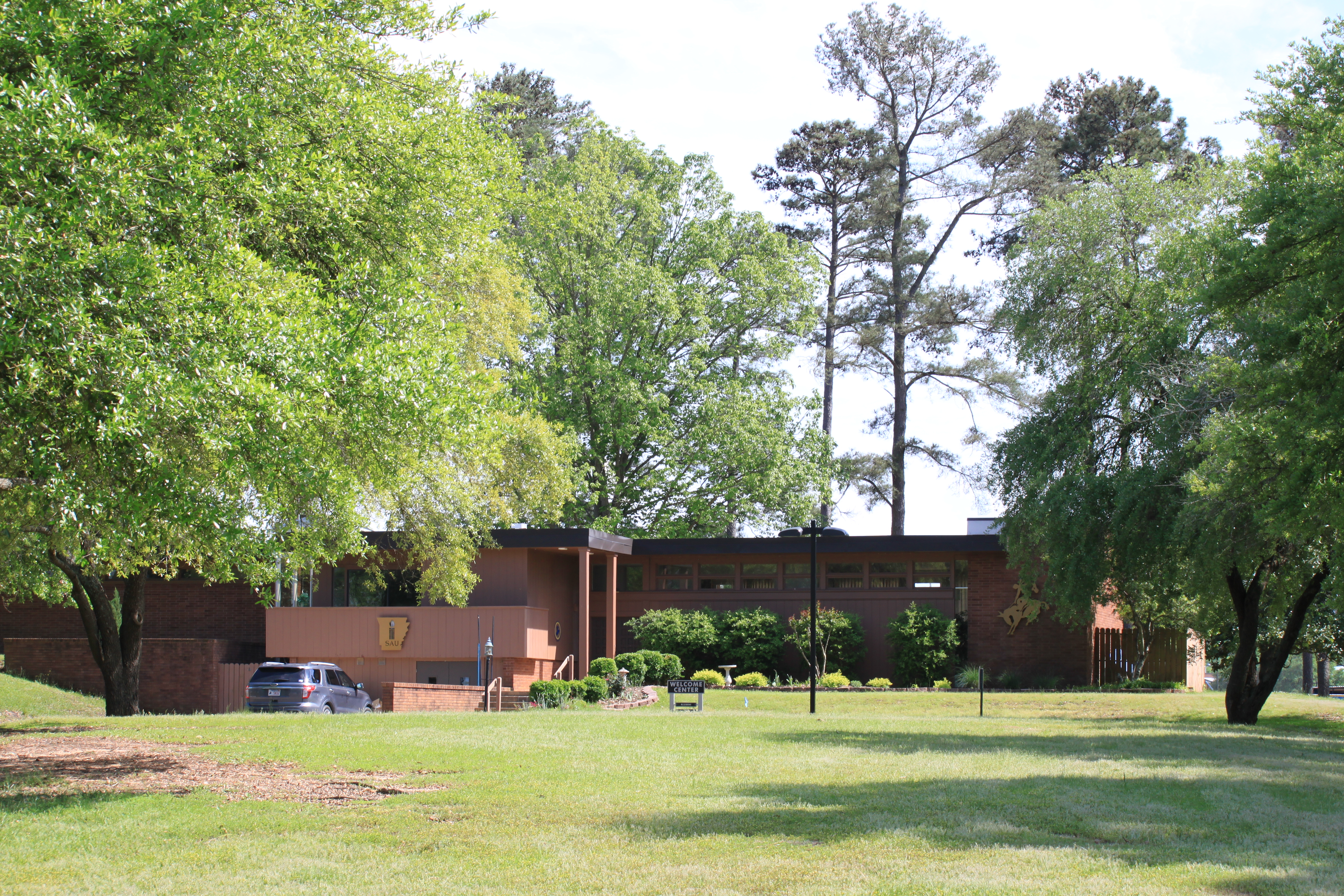
The President's House of Southern Arkansas University, designed by Wittenberg, Delony & Davidson and completed in 1958.

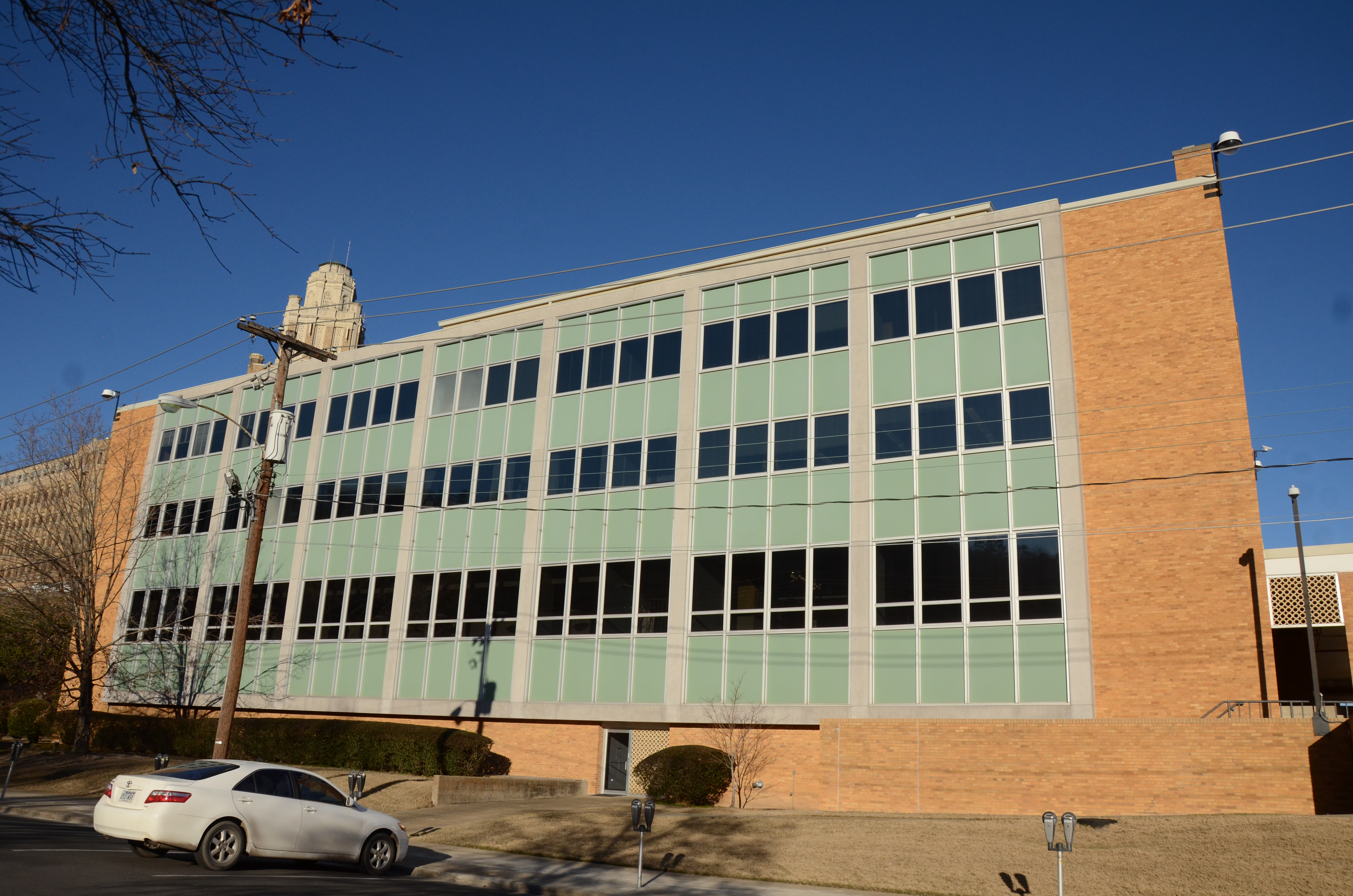
The Federal Building and United States Courthouse in Hot Springs, designed by Wittenberg, Delony & Davidson and completed in 1960.

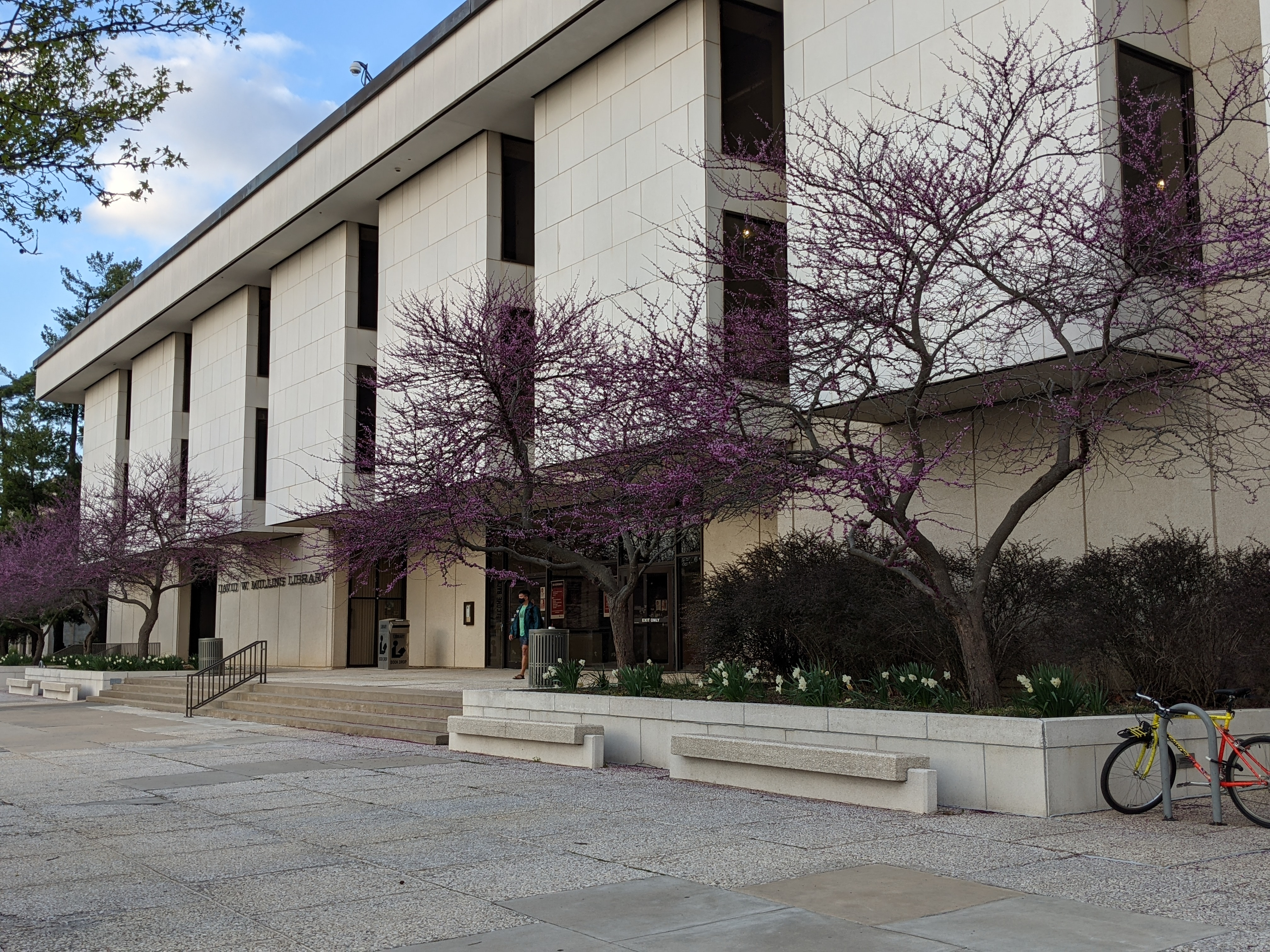
The David W. Mullins Library of the University of Arkansas, designed by Wittenberg, Delony & Davidson and completed in 1968.

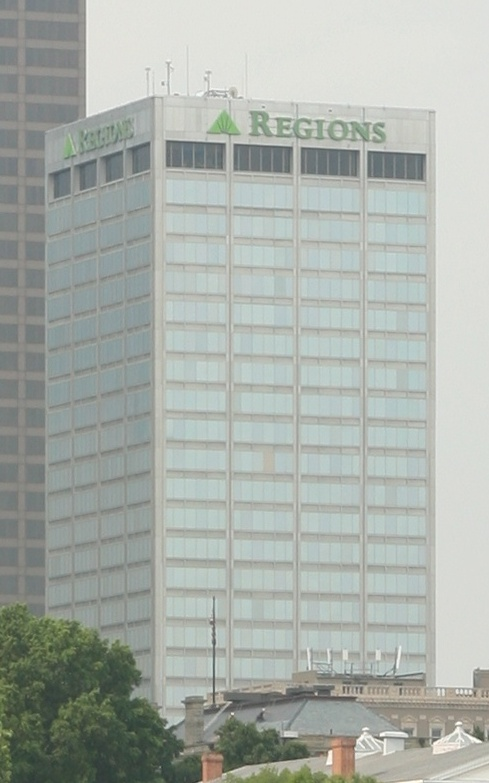
The Regions Center in Little Rock, designed by Wittenberg, Delony & Davidson and completed in 1975.

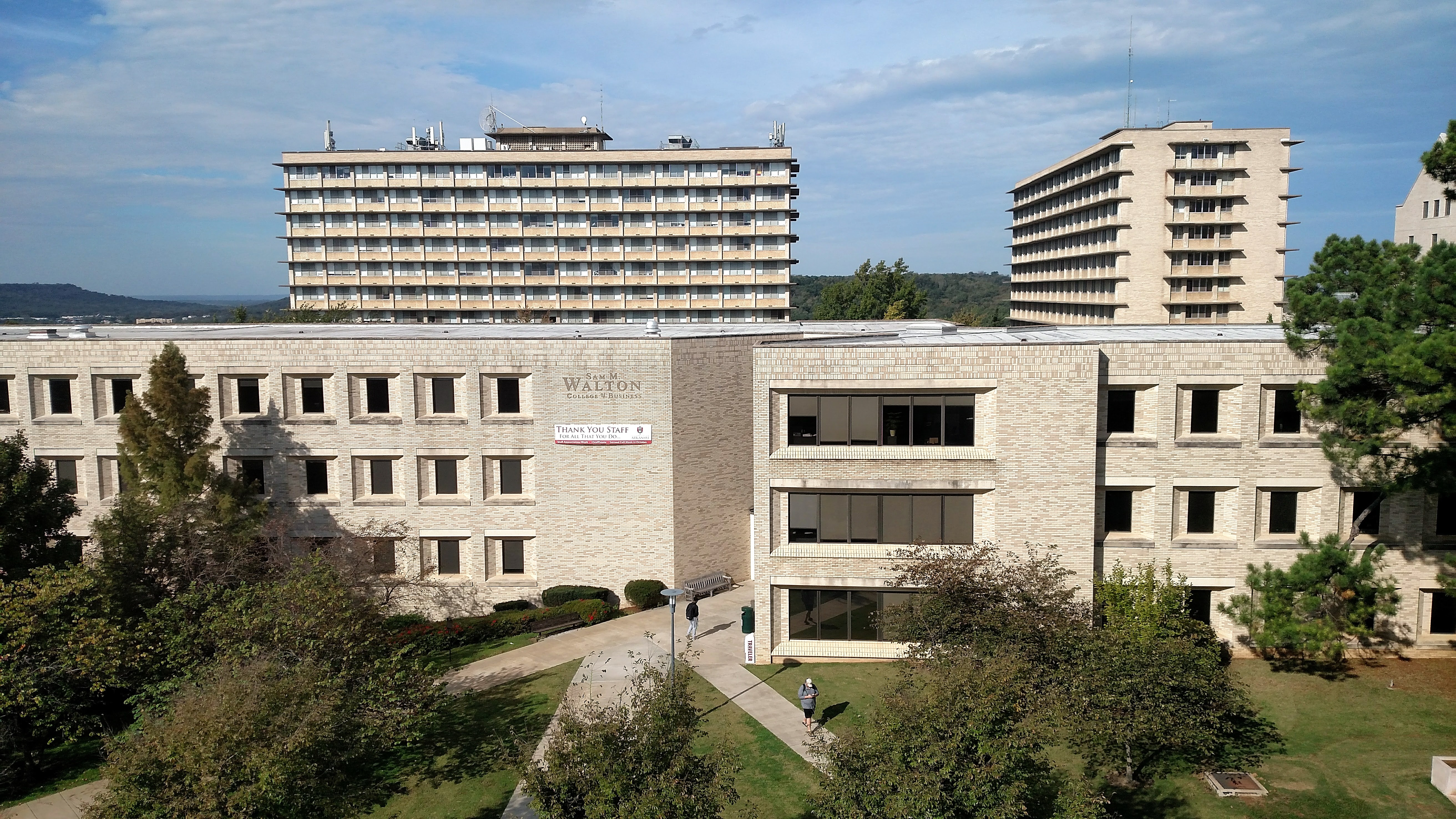
The Business Building of the University of Arkansas, designed by Wittenberg, Delony & Davidson and completed in 1978.

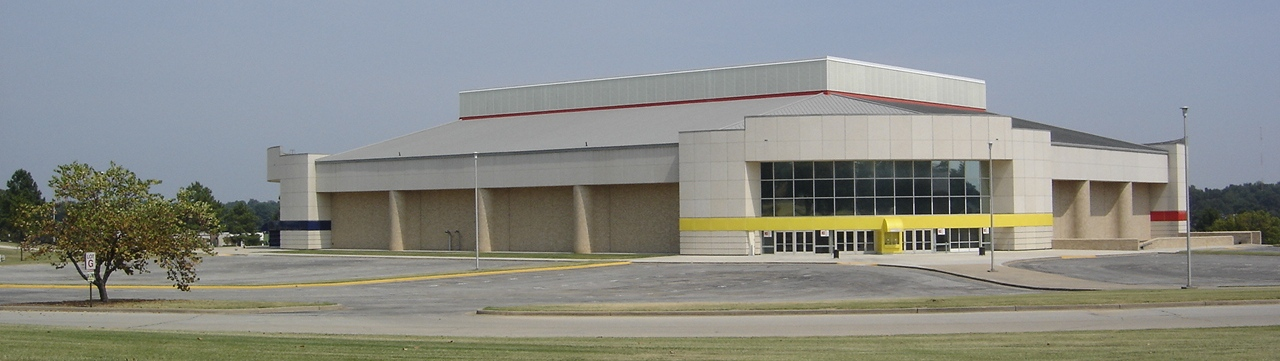
The First National Bank Arena of Arkansas State University, designed by Wittenberg, Delony & Davidson and completed in 1987.

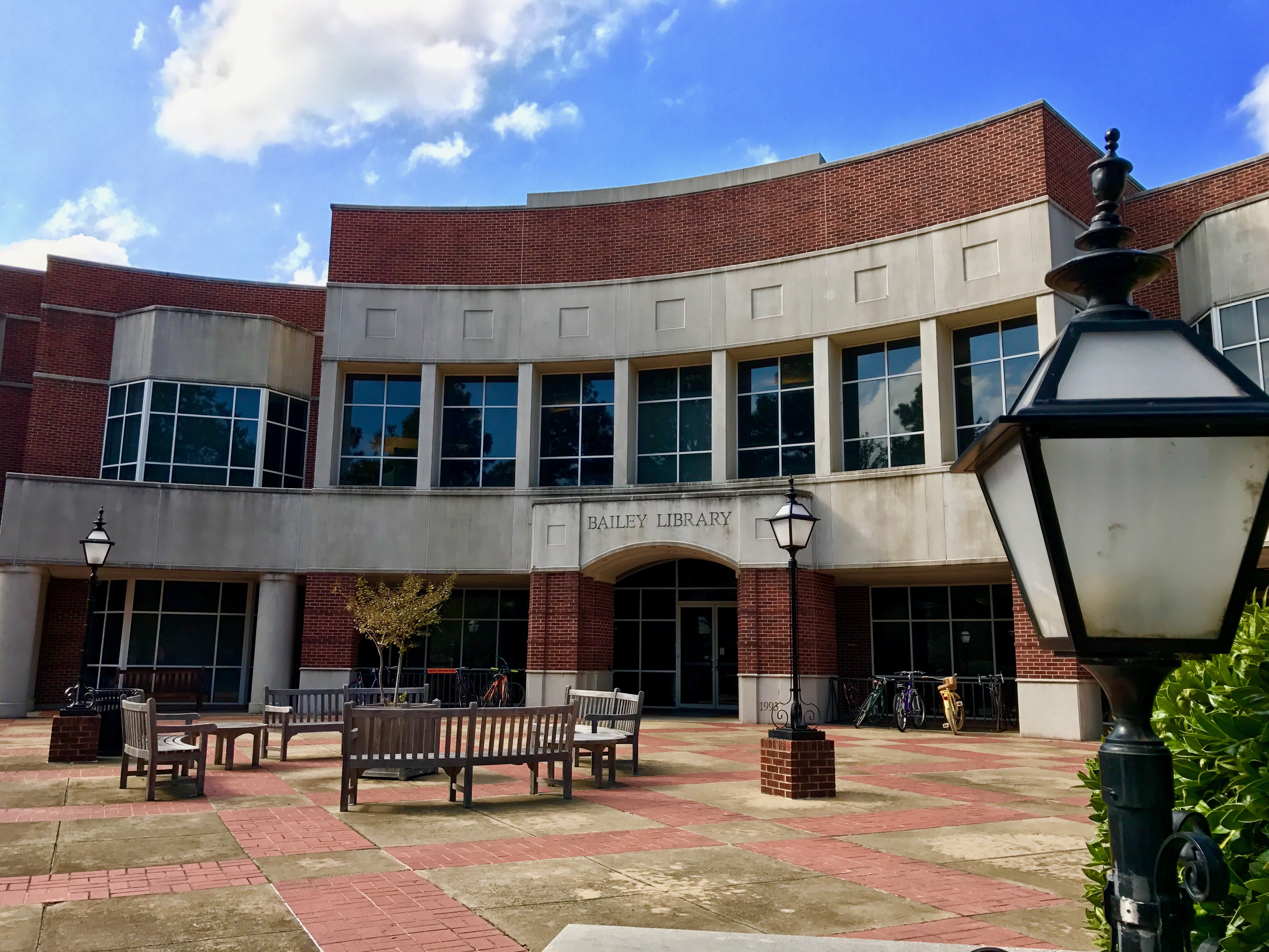
The Olin C. Bailey Library of Hendrix College, designed by Wittenberg, Delony & Davidson and completed in 1994.

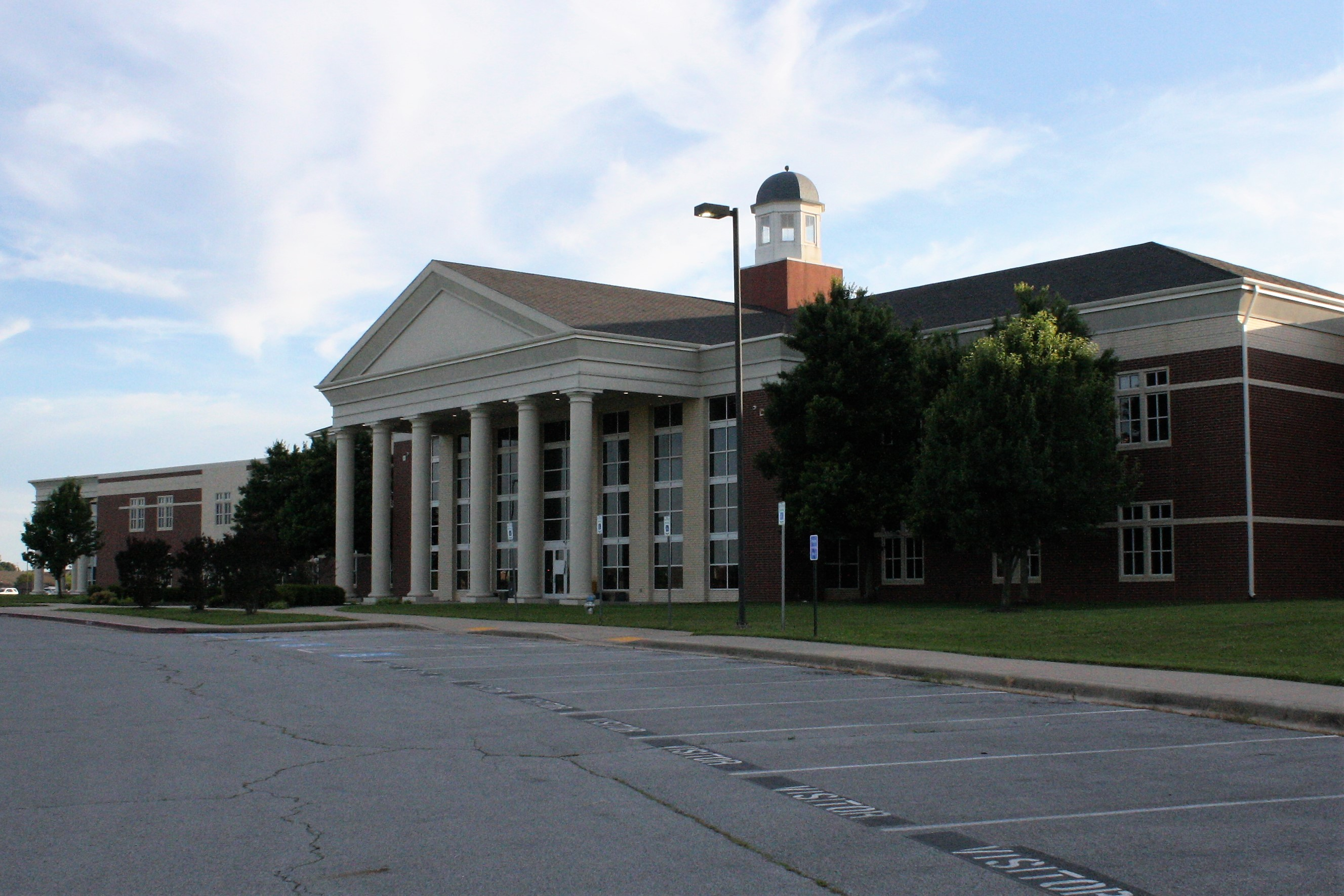
The Har-Ber High School in Springdale, designed by Wittenberg, Delony & Davidson and completed in 2005.

Wittenberg, Delony & Davidson is an American architectural firm. It was founded 106 years ago in 1919 in Little Rock, Arkansas as Wittenberg & Delony by architects George H. Wittenberg and Lawson L. Delony. Wittenberg's son, Gordon G. Wittenberg, assumed control of the firm in 1959 and under the leadership of him and his successor, Thomas A. Gray, the firm was well known for its high standards of design. The firm has since moved to North Little Rock and is active under the name WDD Architects.

== History ==
The firm of Wittenberg & Delony was established in 1919 in Little Rock as the partnership of architects George H. Wittenberg and Lawson L. Delony, who were childhood friends. The firm's business was initially slow, and to cover expenses Wittenberg taught mechanical drawing and coached football at Little Rock High School. In 1925 they were one of the three associated architects chosen to design the new high school (1927), which cemented their reputation. They were responsible for schools, college buildings and courthouses. During the depression they completed the Robinson Center (1939).

After World War II, they expanded the partnership to include Julian B. Davidson as Wittenberg, Delony & Davidson. They continued to work on the same project types, and added large office buildings, such as the Arkansas Power and Light Building (1959), to their project list. For fifty years they were the sole architect for Southern Arkansas University and also completed projects for the University of Arkansas and for Arkansas Tech University.

In 1952 the partnership was expanded to include Gordon G. Wittenberg, Wittenberg's son. The elder Wittenberg died in 1953. When the firm incorporated in 1959, The younger Wittenberg was elected its first president. Works in the 1960s and 1970s included the new Arkansas State Hospital (1965) and the Regions Center (1975), then the tallest building in Little Rock. Davidson, the last of the name partners, retired in 1972. That year Jack See became a principal. In 1976 Wittenberg was succeeded by Thomas A. Gray. Wittenberg and Gray retired in 1983 and 1987, respectively, and Gray was replaced as president by Tom Adams. Adams expanded the firm into prison design, taking advantage of the expansion of prison construction during the 1980s and 1990s. Adams was replaced as president in 2012 by Richard Alderman, a principal since 1984. In 2019 Alderman was replaced by Chad Young, a principal since 2002. Young remains in that position.

== Biographies of notable principals ==
=== George H. Wittenberg ===
George Hyde Wittenberg AIA (September 5, 1892 – December 29, 1953) was born in Little Rock. He was educated at the University of Illinois. He then worked for an architect in Peoria before returning to Little Rock in 1918, where he joined the office of Thomas Harding, for whom he worked until establishing the firm.

Wittenberg was a member of the American Institute of Architects (AIA) and served on the Little Rock planning commission. For much of his career he worked towards an architectural licensing law. When that law finally passed in 1941, Wittenberg was awarded license no. 1 for his efforts. In 1975 his grandson, George H. Wittenberg III, an associate of the firm, was issued license no. 1000.

Wittenberg was married in 1914 to Minnie Greenfield. They had three children, including Gordon Hyde Jr. and Gordon Greenfield. He died in Little Rock at the age of 61.

=== Lawson L. Delony ===
Lawson Leonard Delony AIA (March 14, 1890 – November 20, 1976) was born in Little Rock. Like Wittenberg he was educated at Illinois, plus postgraduate work at Columbia University. He worked for architects George B. Post & Sons and served in World War I before returning to Little Rock in 1919.

Delony was a member of the AIA and served on the Little Rock waterworks commission from 1949 to 1972. As a member of the commission he had a role in the planning of Lake Maumelle, Little Rock's primary source of drinking water.

Delony was married in 1920 to Joyce Manning. They had two children. He died in Little Rock at the age of 86.

=== Julian B. Davidson ===
Julian Bunn Davidson AIA PE (February 23, 1906 – November 28, 1997) was born in Little Rock. He worked for the firm during school vacations before going on to Washington University in St. Louis, from which he graduated in 1928. He then returned to Wittenberg & Delony in Little Rock, where he would stay for his entire career.

Davidson was a member of the AIA and was the first architect in Arkansas to also be licensed as an engineer.

Davidson was married in 1933 to Irene Davis McCall. They had one child. Davidson was interested in railroads and was what would now be called a railfan. Appropriately, he built his family home on a site which kept views neighboring railroad in mind. Davidson died in Little Rock at the age of 91.

=== Gordon G. Wittenberg ===
Gordon Greenfield Wittenberg FAIA (August 12, 1921 – January 8, 2020) was born in Little Rock. He was educated at the University of Arkansas and the University of Illinois, graduating from the latter in 1943 with a BS in architectural engineering. During World War II he served in the air force before joining the firm.

Wittenberg was a member of the American Institute of Architects (AIA) and was elected a Fellow in 1967 in recognition of his service to the architectural profession. He was awarded the Fay Jones Gold Medal of AIA Arkansas in 1992. In 2014 he and Charles Witsell were the authors of Architects of Little Rock, 1833-1950, a collection of biographies of the city's historic architects, and for this he and Witsell were awarded the Dick Savage Award, also from AIA Arkansas.

Wittenberg was married twice, first to Anna Mary Wilkins in 1944 and second to Betty Townsend Rowland. He had two sons. He died in Little Rock at the age of 98.

=== Thomas A. Gray ===
Thomas Albert Gray FAIA (December 16, 1928 – December 21, 2014) was born in Indianapolis. He was educated at the University of Cincinnati, graduating in 1953 with a BS. He served in the air force until 1957, when he was discharged in Arkansas and joined Wittenberg, Delony & Davidson.

Gray was a member of the AIA. He was elected a Fellow in 1984 and was awarded the Fay Jones Gold Medal Award in 2003.

He was married in 1953 to Ruth Ann and they had two children. He died in Little Rock at the age of 86.

=== Jack See ===
Jack Fletcher See Jr. FAIA (born April 9, 1935) was born in Little Rock. He was educated at the University of Arkansas, where he studied under E. Fay Jones and graduated in 1958 with a BArch. He worked for two years for The Office of Walk C. Jones Jr. in Memphis, Tennessee, before going on to Yale University. He earned an MArch in 1962 and returned to Little Rock, where he joined the firm. By 1970 he was director of interior design.

See is a member of the AIA and was elected a Fellow in 2009 in recognition of his service to society. He was awarded the Fay Jones Gold Medal in 2008.

See was married in 1958 to Judy Park. They have two children.

== Legacy ==
During the 1960s and 1970s the firm's work was frequently featured in the national architectural press. They were awarded three prestigious Progressive Architecture Awards: for the Arkansas State Hospital in 1963, the Henderson Junior High School in 1964 and the Arkansas Department of Health office building in 1966.

At least eleven of the firm's works have been individually listed on the United States National Register of Historic Places, including the family homes of Davidson and Gray. Other works contribute to listed historic districts.

== Architectural works ==
=== Wittenberg & Delony, 1919-1946 ===
- 1922 – Arkansas Christian College Administration Building, (Note: NRHP-listed.) 100 W Harding St, Morrilton, Arkansas
- 1925 – Gay Oil Company Building, 300 South Broadway St, Little Rock, Arkansas
- 1927 – Little Rock Central High School, (Note: Designed by Mann & Stern, John Parks Almand and Wittenberg & Delony, associated architects. A National Historic Landmark.) 1500 Little Rock Nine Way, Little Rock, Arkansas
- 1929 – Dunbar Junior and Senior High School and Junior College, (Note: A contributing resource to the Paul Laurence Dunbar School Neighborhood Historic District, NRHP-listed in 2013.) 1100 Wright Ave, Little Rock, Arkansas
- 1932 – First United Methodist Church, 121 Harrison Ave SW, Camden, Arkansas
- 1935 – Chemistry Building, (Note: NRHP-listed. Also a contributing resource to the University of Arkansas Campus Historic District, NRHP-listed in 2009.) University of Arkansas, Fayetteville, Arkansas
- 1936 – Cross and Nelson Halls, (Note: The contributing resources of the Cross and Nelson Hall Historic District, NRHP-listed in 2010.) Southern Arkansas University, Magnolia, Arkansas
- 1936 – Faulkner County Courthouse, 801 Locust St, Conway, Arkansas
- 1937 – Gibson Hall, (Note: A contributing resource to the University of Arkansas Campus Historic District, NRHP-listed in 2009.) University of Arkansas, Fayetteville, Arkansas
- 1939 – Arch Ford Education Building, 4 Capitol Mall, Little Rock, Arkansas
- 1939 – Robinson Center, (Note: Designed by Eugene J. Stern and Wittenberg & Delony, associated architects. NRHP-listed.) 426 W Markham St, Little Rock, Arkansas
- 1940 – Independence County Courthouse, 192 E Main St, Batesville, Arkansas
- 1943 – Lincoln County Courthouse, 300 S Drew St, Star City, Arkansas
- 1943 – Overstreet Hall, Southern Arkansas University, Magnolia, Arkansas

=== Wittenberg, Delony & Davidson, from 1946 ===
- 1948 – Gregson Hall, University of Arkansas, Fayetteville, Arkansas
- 1950 – Bussey Hall, (Note: A contributing resource to the Dolph Camp, Bussey and Peace Halls Historic District, NRHP-listed in 2013.) Southern Arkansas University, Magnolia, Arkansas
- 1951 – Julian Bunn Davidson House, (Note: Designed by Davidson as his family home. Davidson, who was what would now be termed a railfan, sited his house with views of the neighboring railroad in mind. NRHP-listed.) 410 S Battery St, Little Rock, Arkansas
- 1951 – Peace Hall, Southern Arkansas University, Magnolia, Arkansas
- 1952 – Synagogue Agudath Achim, (Note: Demolished.) 801 S Louisiana St, Little Rock, Arkansas
- 1956 – Piggott National Guard Armory, 775 East Main St, Piggott, Arkansas
- 1957 – Dolph Camp Hall, Southern Arkansas University, Magnolia, Arkansas
- 1958 – President's House, Southern Arkansas University, Magnolia, Arkansas
- 1959 – Arkansas Power and Light Building, (Note: Designed principally by Fred E. Arnold Jr. NRHP-listed.) 900 S Louisiana St, Little Rock, Arkansas
- 1960 – Empire Life Insurance Company of America Building, (Note: Designed principally by Gray. NRHP-listed.) 2801 W Roosevelt Rd, Little Rock, Arkansas
- 1960 – Federal Building and United States Courthouse, 100 Reserve St, Hot Springs, Arkansas
- 1963 – Booker Junior High School, 2016 Barber St, Little Rock, Arkansas
- 1963 – Thomas Gray House, (Note: Designed by Gray as his family home. NRHP-listed.) 25 River Valley Rd, Little Rock, Arkansas
- 1963 – Majestic Hotel Lanai Towers addition, Park Ave, Hot Springs, Arkansas
- 1963 – McEver Hall, Arkansas Tech University, Russellville, Arkansas
- 1963 – Talbot Hall, (Note: A contributing resource to the Greene-Talbot-Talley Halls Historic District, NRHP-listed in 2023.) Southern Arkansas University, Magnolia, Arkansas
- 1964 – Central Arkansas Milk Producers Association office building, 6423 Forbing Rd, Little Rock, Arkansas
- 1964 – Henderson Junior High School (former), (Note: Designed principally by Fred E. Arnold Jr.) 401 John Barrow Rd, Little Rock, Arkansas
- 1964 – Talley Hall, Southern Arkansas University, Magnolia, Arkansas
- 1965 – Arkansas State Hospital campus, 305 S Palm St, Little Rock, Arkansas
- 1965 – Mountain View Towers, 100 Highrise Cir, Hot Springs, Arkansas
- 1966 – Arkansas Louisiana Gas Company office building, 400 E Capitol Ave, Little Rock, Arkansas
- 1966 – Greene Hall, Southern Arkansas University, Magnolia, Arkansas
- 1967 – Olin C. Bailey Library, (Note: Designed by Philip Johnson, architect, with Wittenberg, Delony & Davidson, associate architects. Abandoned and later demolished in 1998 after the underground building proved unworkable.) Hendrix College, Conway, Arkansas
- 1968 – David W. Mullins Library, University of Arkansas, Fayetteville, Arkansas
- 1968 – Second Presbyterian Church, 600 Pleasant Valley Dr, Little Rock, Arkansas
- 1969 – Arkansas Department of Health office building, 4815 W Markham St, Little Rock, Arkansas
- 1969 – Gordon G. Wittenberg house, 4801 Country Club Blvd, Little Rock, Arkansas
- 1970 – Riceland Foods headquarters, 2120 S Park Ave, Stuttgart, Arkansas
- 1970 – Wilson Hall, Southern Arkansas University, Magnolia, Arkansas
- 1972 – Fred W. Parris Towers, 1800 S Broadway St, Little Rock, Arkansas
- 1972 – Wharton Nursing Building, Southern Arkansas University, Magnolia, Arkansas
- 1973 – Arkansas Union, University of Arkansas, Fayetteville, Arkansas
- 1974 – Cumberland Towers, 311 E 8th St, Little Rock, Arkansas
- 1975 – Mills Center for the Social Sciences, Hendrix College, Conway, Arkansas
- 1975 – Regions Center, (Note: The tallest building in Little Rock and Arkansas until the Simmons Tower was completed in 1986.) 400 W Capitol Ave, Little Rock, Arkansas
- 1977 – Christ the King Catholic Church, (Note: Designed principally by Fred E. Arnold Jr. Altered.) 4002 N Rodney Parham Rd, Little Rock, Arkansas
- 1978 – Business Building, University of Arkansas, Fayetteville, Arkansas
- 1980 – North Arkansas College, Harrison, Arkansas
- 1983 – Fausett Hall, Hendrix College, Conway, Arkansas
- 1987 – First National Bank Arena, Arkansas State University, Jonesboro, Arkansas
- 1994 – Olin C. Bailey Library, Hendrix College, Conway, Arkansas
- 2000 – Donald W. Reynolds Center for Academic Excellence. Arkansas State University Mid-South, West Memphis, Arkansas
- 2005 – Har-Ber High School, 300 Jones Rd, Springdale, Arkansas
- 2009 – Bear Stadium, University of Central Arkansas, Conway, Arkansas
- 2011 – Maumelle High School, 100 Victory Ln, Maumelle, Arkansas
