= Regions Center =

Regions Center may refer to:

- Regions Center (Birmingham), a skyscraper in Birmingham, Alabama, USA
- Regions Center (Little Rock), a skyscraper in Little Rock, Arkansas, USA
- A skyscraper in Nashville, Tennessee, USA, now known as the UBS Tower (Nashville)
