= Faulkner County Courthouse =

- U.S. National Register of Historic Places
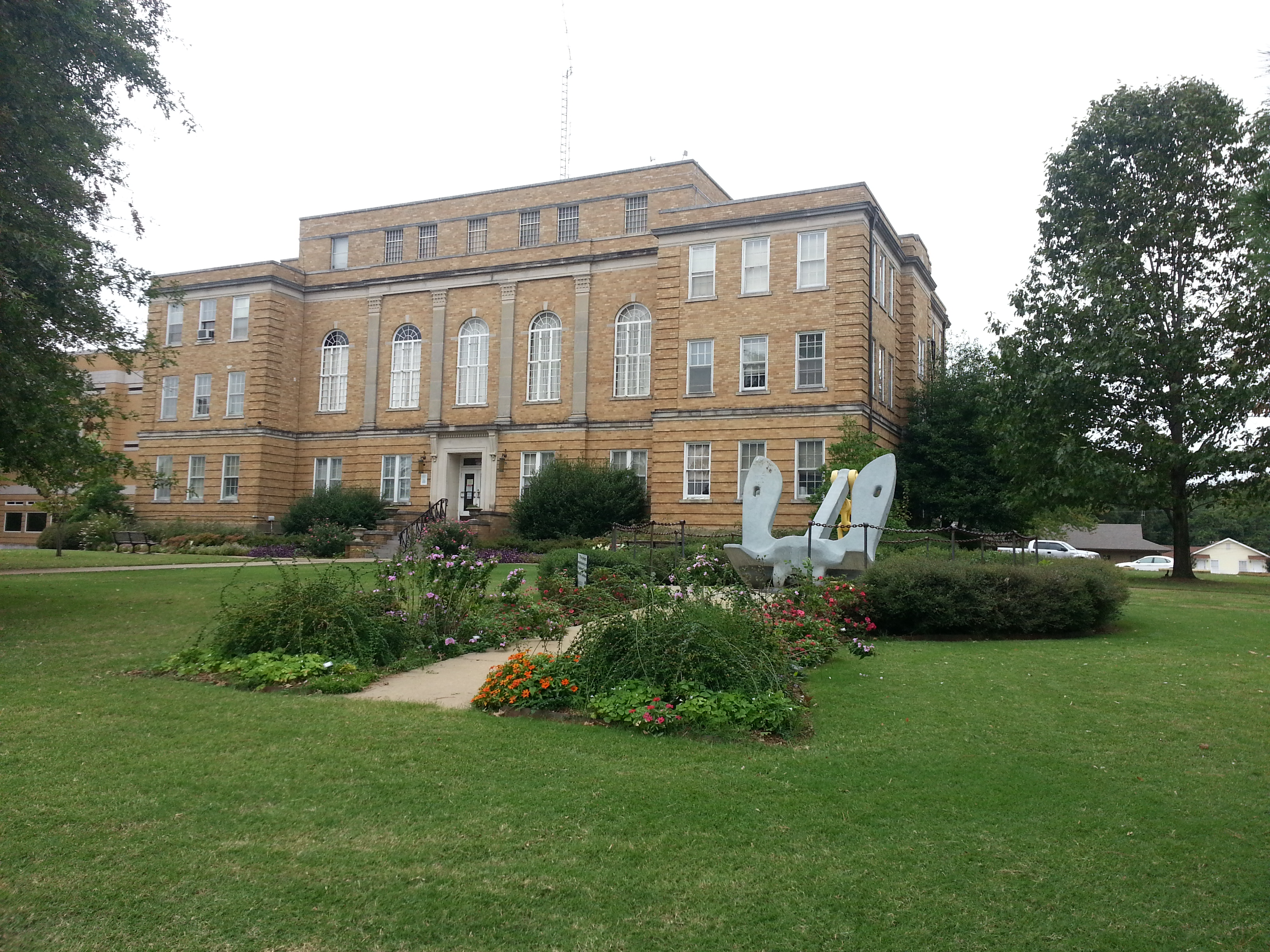

- Location within Arkansas Location within the United States
- Location: 801 Locust St., Conway, Arkansas
- Coordinates: 35°5′20″N 92°26′34″W
- Area: 2.5 acres (1.0 ha)
- Built: 1936
- Architect: Wittenberg & Delony
- Architectural style: Colonial Revival, Art Deco
- NRHP reference No.: 95001381
- Added to NRHP: November 27, 1995

The Faulkner County Courthouse is located at 801 Locust Street in Conway, the county seat of Faulkner County, Arkansas. It is a four-story masonry structure, built out of light-colored brick and concrete. It has an H shape, with symmetrical wings on either side of a center section. The center section has two-story round-arch windows, separated by pilasters, in the middle floors above the main entrance. The fourth floor is set back from the lower floors. Built in 1936 to a design by Wittenberg & Delony, it is an unusual combination of Colonial Revival and Art Deco architecture.

The building was listed on the National Register of Historic Places in 1995.

== See also ==
- National Register of Historic Places listings in Faulkner County, Arkansas
