= Lincoln County Courthouse (Arkansas) =

Historic place in Arkansas, United States

- U.S. National Register of Historic Places
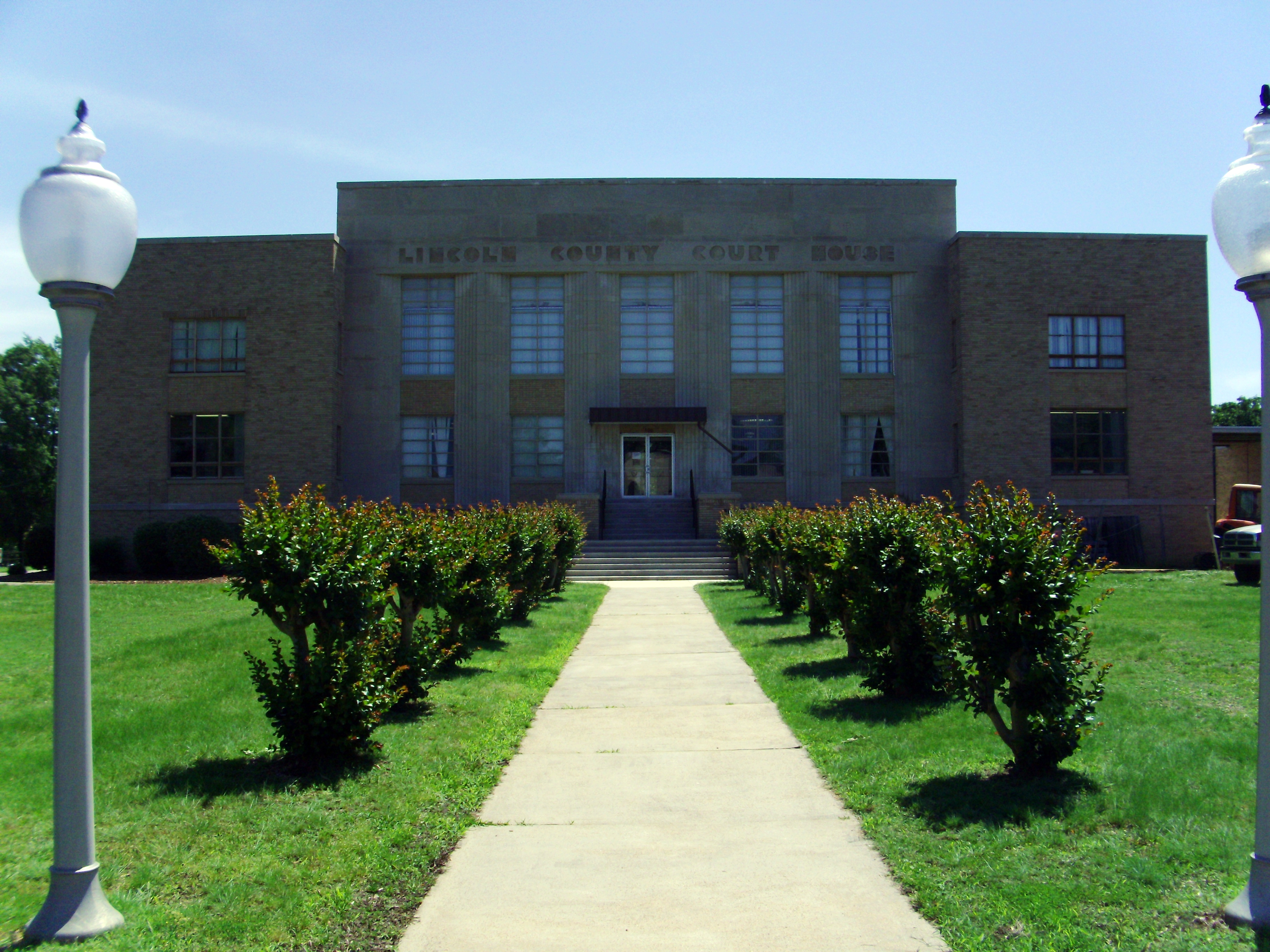

- Location within Arkansas Location within the United States
- Location: 300 S. Drew St., Star City, Arkansas
- Coordinates: 33°56′22″N 91°50′40″W
- Area: 4 acres (1.6 ha)
- Architect: Wittenberg & Delony
- Architectural style: Art Deco
- NRHP reference No.: 94000141
- Added to NRHP: March 7, 1994

The county courthouse of Lincoln County, Arkansas is located at 300 South Drew Street in Star City, the county seat. The two story building was designed by Wittenberg & Delony of Little Rock and built in 1943. It is predominantly buff-colored brick, with limestone trim, and has a flat roof that is hidden by a parapet. The building's front, or western, elevation, has a central projecting section that is slightly taller than the wing sections, and is faced primarily in limestone. Four triangular stepped limestone pilasters frame the elements of this section, including the main entrance in the central bay, which now has replacement doors of aluminum and glass. Above the pilasters is a limestone panel identifying the building as the "Lincoln County Courthouse" in Art Deco lettering. It is believed to be the only Art Deco building in the county.

The courthouse was listed on the National Register of Historic Places in 1994.

== See also ==
- List of county courthouses in Arkansas
- National Register of Historic Places listings in Lincoln County, Arkansas
