= Piggott National Guard Armory =

- U.S. National Register of Historic Places
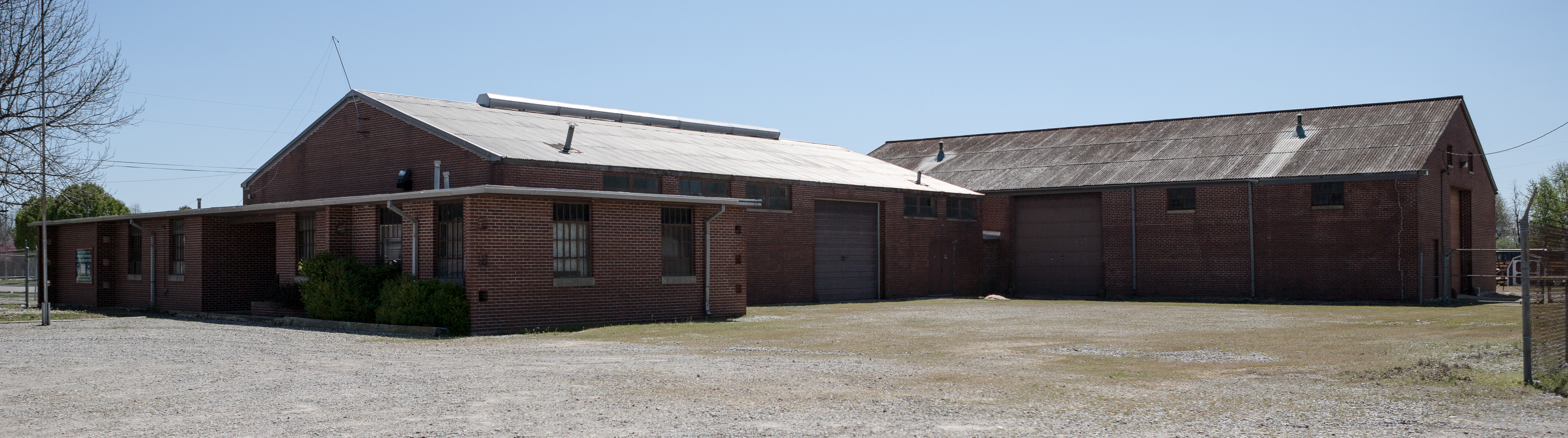

- Location within Arkansas Location within the United States
- Location: 775 E. Main St., Piggott, Arkansas
- Coordinates: 36°22′59″N 90°10′53″W
- Area: 1 acre (0.40 ha)
- Built: 1956
- Architect: Wittenberg, Delony & Davidson; Cox Lumber Co.
- Architectural style: Plain/Traditional
- NRHP reference No.: 06000440
- Added to NRHP: May 31, 2006

The Piggott National Guard Armory is a historic former Arkansas National Guard facility at 775 East Main Street in Piggott, Arkansas. It is a large single-story concrete block structure, finished with a brick veneer, and topped by a gable roof with a clerestory section at the top. The building was erected in 1956, during a period when armory spaces were undergoing a shift in use and scope. The building was used as an armory until 2005, when it was given to the city by the state.

The building was listed on the National Register of Historic Places in 2006.

== See also ==
- National Register of Historic Places listings in Clay County, Arkansas
