= Cumberland Towers =

Historic residential building in Arkansas, United States

- U.S. National Register of Historic Places
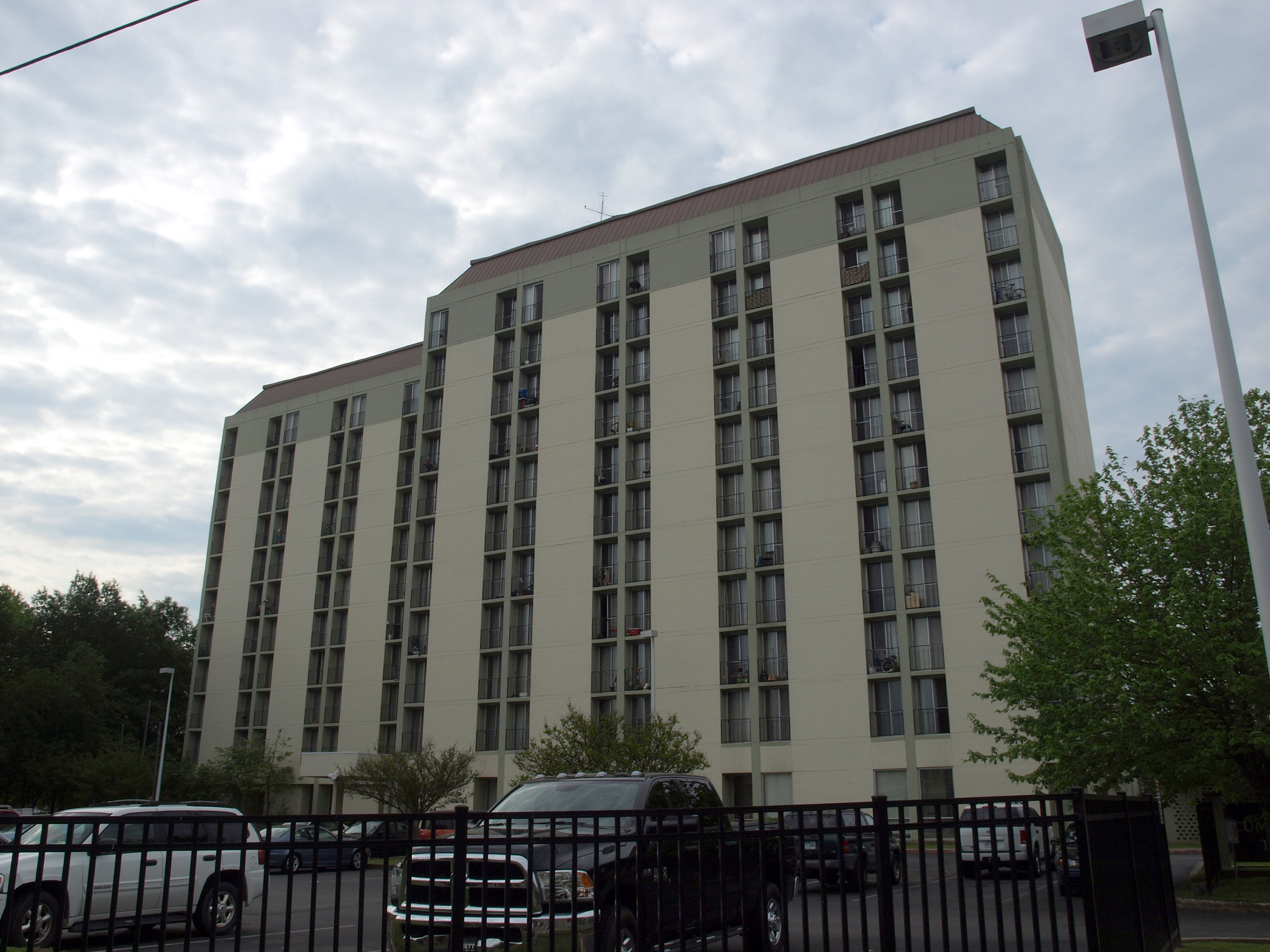

- Location within Arkansas Location within the United States
- Location: 311 E. 8th St., Little Rock, Arkansas
- Coordinates: 34°44′27″N 92°16′9″W
- Area: 2 acres (0.81 ha)
- Built: 1974
- Architect: Wittenberg, Delony & Davidson
- Architectural style: International Style
- NRHP reference No.: 100000706
- Added to NRHP: March 7, 2017

The Cumberland Towers are a residential apartment highrise at 311 East 8th Street in Little Rock, Arkansas. Built in 1974, it is an eleven-story skyscraper, with a steel frame clad in stuccoed brick, housing 178 residential units. It was designed by Wittenberg, Delony & Davidson for the city as public senior housing, it exemplifies a design principle espoused by Le Corbusier known as the "tower in a park", with a large landscaped green area surrounding the building.

The apartments were listed on the National Register of Historic Places in 2017.

== See also ==
- National Register of Historic Places listings in Little Rock, Arkansas
