= Simmons Bank =

American bank

Simmons First National Corporation
- Type: Public
- Traded as: Nasdaq: SFNC; S&P 600 Component
- Industry: Financial services
- Founded: March 23, 1903; 123 years ago
- Headquarters: 501 Main Street; Pine Bluff, Arkansas; United States
- Area served: Arkansas; Kansas; Missouri; Oklahoma; Tennessee; Texas
- Key people: James M. Brogdon (president & CEO); C. Daniel Hobbs (CFO)
- Net income: ▼ −$397.6 million (2025)
- Total assets: ▼$24.5 billion (2025)
- Total equity: ▼$3.4 billion (2025)
- Number of employees: 2,917 (2025)
- Website: simmonsbank.com

Simmons Bank is a bank with operations in Arkansas, Kansas, Missouri, Oklahoma, Tennessee, and Texas. It is the primary subsidiary of Simmons First National Corporation, a bank holding company.

== History ==
The bank was founded by physician Dr. John Franklin Simmons in Pine Bluff, Arkansas in 1903. In 1933, during the Great Depression, it was one of the first Arkansas banks to reopen after the federally imposed “bank holiday”. In 1967, the bank was the first in Arkansas to offer a credit card. On March 23, 1984, a customer (Mary Stone) withdrew $285 from an automated teller machine in Sydney, Australia in the first intercontinental transaction made ever via an ATM.

In September 2012, in a transaction organized by the FDIC, the company acquired Truman Bank, which suffered from bank failure.

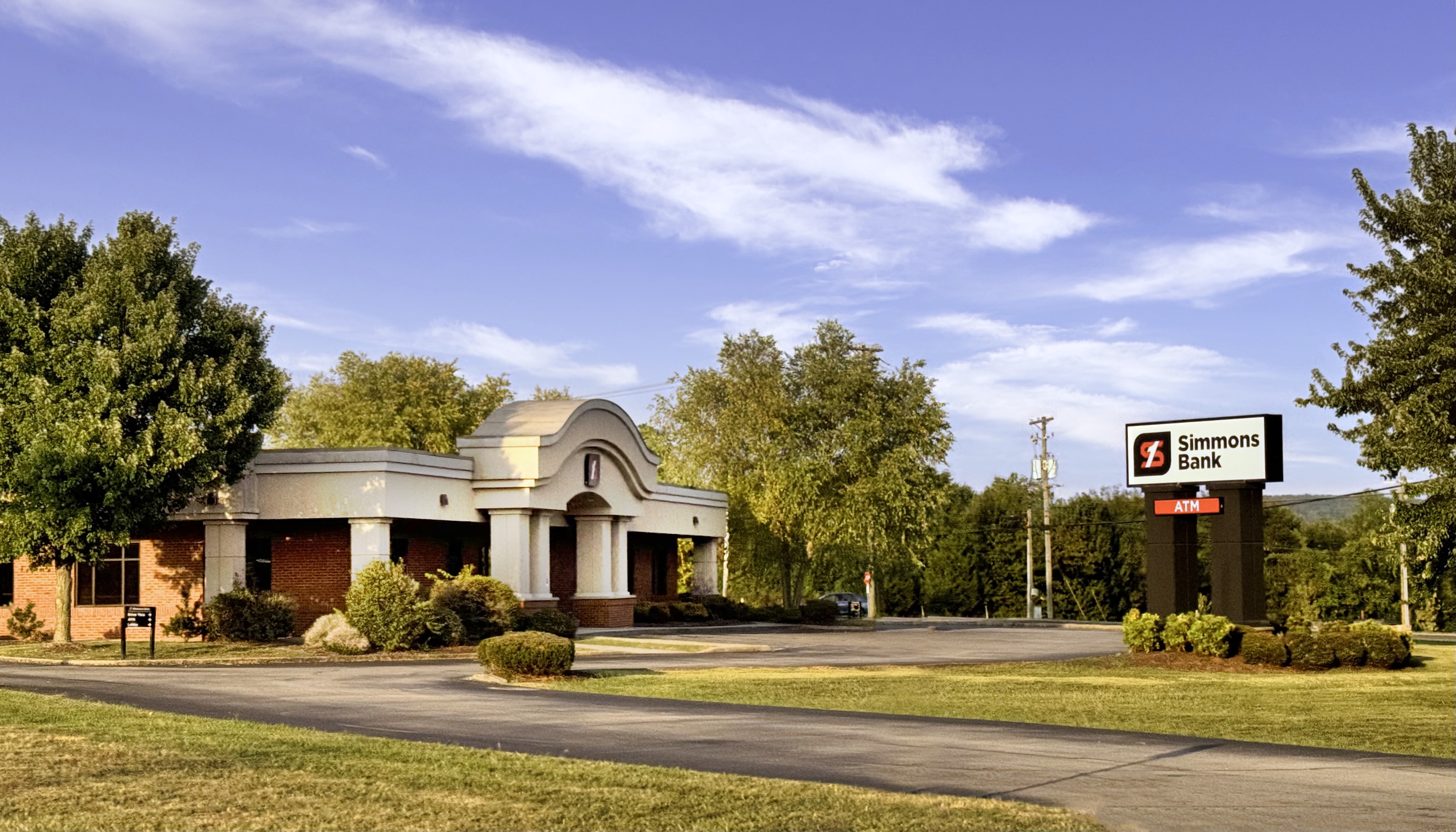
Simmons Bank in Sweetwater, Tennessee

In October 2012, the company acquired Excel Bank. In November 2013, the company acquired Metropolitan National Bank. The purchase included the Simmons Tower. In August 2014, the company acquired Delta Trust & Bank. In February 2015, the company acquired Liberty Bancshares and Community First Bancshares. In November 2015, the company acquired Ozark Trust and Investment Corp. In September 2016, the company acquired Citizens National Bank. In May 2017, the company acquired First South Bank. In October 2017, the company acquired Southwest Bancorp, Inc. and First Texas BHC, Inc. In April 2019, the company acquired Reliance Bancshares, Inc.

In July 2019, the company acquired Landmark Bank, Inc., a subsidiary of Landrum, the parent company, headquartered in Columbia, Missouri, for an estimated $434 million. The merger was finalized and marketing changes took place on February 18, 2020. In November 2021, the company purchased Spirit of Texas Bancshares, with the acquisition completed and locations converted in April 2022.
