= Arkansas Power and Light Building =

- Arkansas Power & Light Building
- U.S. National Register of Historic Places
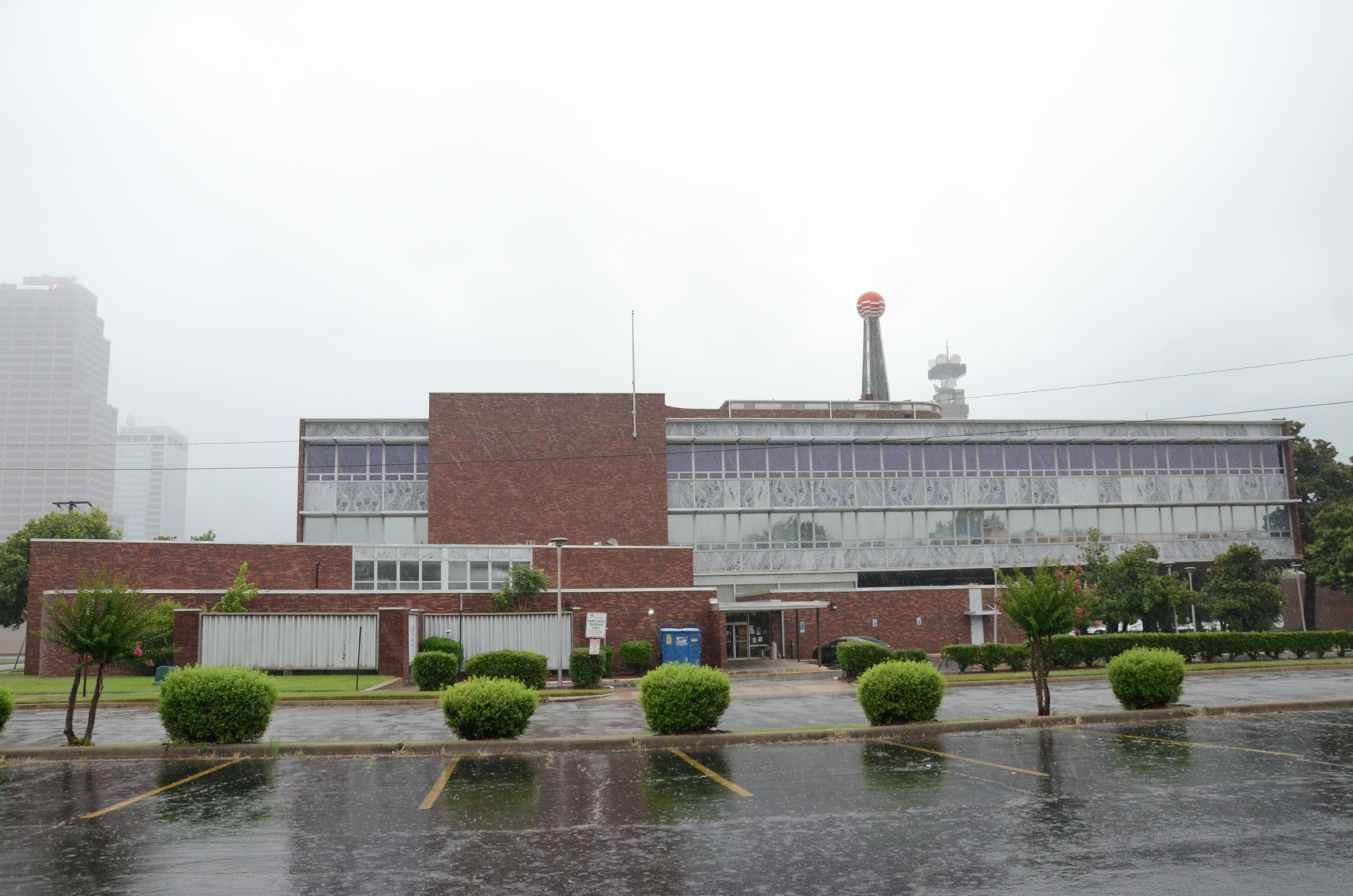

- Location within Arkansas Location within the United States
- Location: Jct. of Ninth St. and Louisiana St., Little Rock, Arkansas
- Coordinates: 34°44′24″N 92°16′26″W
- Area: 2 acres (0.81 ha)
- Built: 1953
- Architect: Wittenberg, Delony & Davidson
- Architectural style: International style
- NRHP reference No.: 92001156
- Added to NRHP: September 14, 1992

The Arkansas Power and Light Building is a building in the city of Little Rock, Arkansas. The building is listed in the National Register of Historic Places. Now also known as the Entergy Building, it was the first office building in downtown Little Rock built in the International style. Designed by the architect Fred Arnold of the Little Rock architectural firm of Wittenberg, Delony & Davidson in 1953, it was not completed until 1959 due to uncertainty over the utility's requested rate increases and the expiration of laborers' union contracts.

Acclaimed at the time for its "modern" look, the building features marble panels and glass curtain wall, above a single-story, curvilinear brick masonry section at the western end. It was one of Little Rock's first buildings built after the city formally adopted its "Little Rock 1969" master plan. The plan controlled new commercial design and encouraged private-public partnership for downtown beautification over the next decade.

The building at 900 S. Louisiana St. houses Entergy Arkansas, the successor to Arkansas Power and Light Co. It has continually been the utility's headquarters.

== Restoration ==
Over time the original Georgia Pearl Gray marble panels began to fail due to weather and bowing. In 2010, the panels were removed and replaced with new panels. The historic structure was unable to bear the weight of the stone, so 1/4-inch thick Georgia Pearl Gray marble, from the original quarry was bonded to an aluminum honeycomb backing and used to replace the original panels.

The panels are consistent with the U.S. secretary of the Interior's standards for rehabilitation of historic properties and the building retains its National Register listing. The work received the Historic Preservation Alliance of Arkansas award.

== See also ==
- National Register of Historic Places listings in Little Rock, Arkansas
