= Federal Building–U.S. Post Office and Court House (Hot Springs, Arkansas) =

- U.S. National Register of Historic Places
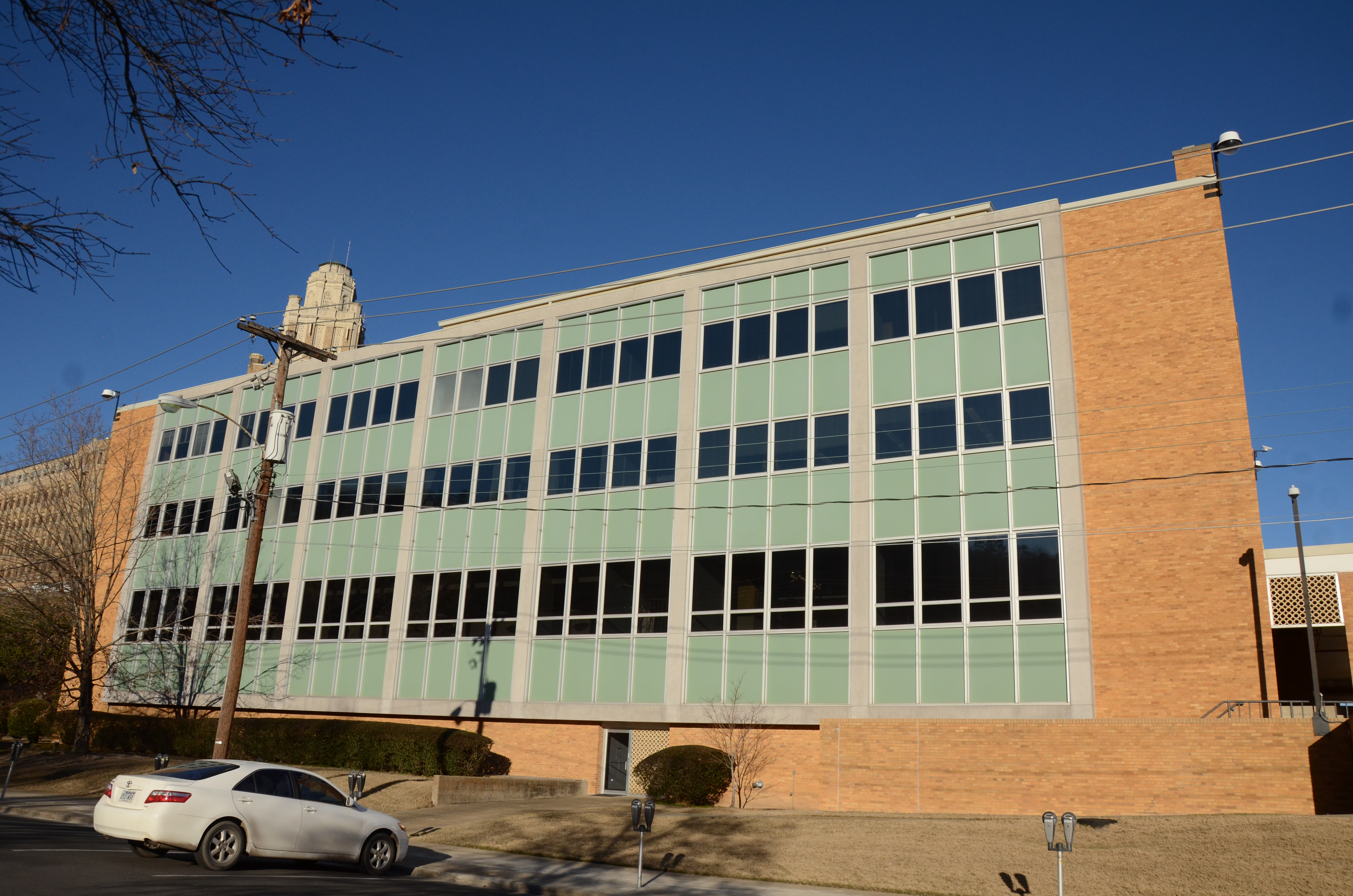

- Location within Arkansas Location within the United States
- Location: 100 Reserve St., Hot Springs, Arkansas
- Coordinates: 34°30′42″N 93°3′14″W
- Area: less than one acre
- Built: 1960
- Architect: Wittenberg, Delony & Davidson
- Architectural style: International
- NRHP reference No.: 15000205
- Added to NRHP: May 5, 2015

The Hot Springs Federal Courthouse is located at 100 Reserve Street in Hot Springs, Arkansas. It is a three-story building, with a steel frame clad in orange brick, with porcelain panels and aluminum-clad windows. It was designed by the Little Rock firm Wittenberg, Delony & Davidson, and was built in 1959–60 on the site of the Eastman Hotel, once one of the city's largest spa hotels. It is one of the city's best examples of commercial International architecture.

The courthouse was listed on the National Register of Historic Places in 2015 as the Federal Building–U.S. Post Office and Court House.

== See also ==
- National Register of Historic Places listings in Garland County, Arkansas
