= Robinson Center =

- Joseph Taylor Robinson Memorial Auditorium
- U.S. National Register of Historic Places
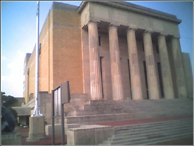
- Robinson Center Music Hall, located at the intersection of Markham and Broadway Streets in downtown Little Rock

- Location within Arkansas Location within the United States
- Location: 426 W. Markham, Little Rock, Arkansas
- Coordinates: 34°44′57″N 92°16′28″W
- Built: 1939
- Architect: Eugene J. Stern and Wittenberg & Delony
- Architectural style: Art Deco
- MPS: New Deal Recovery Efforts in Arkansas MPS
- NRHP reference No.: 07000056
- Added to NRHP: February 21, 2007

The Robinson Center is a performance, convention, and exhibition space at Statehouse Plaza in downtown Little Rock, Arkansas.

The most notable architectural feature of the complex is the south façade of the Robinson Center Music Hall, a building constructed in 1939 to a design by architects Eugene J. Stern and Wittenberg & Delony. It is adorned with columns that echo the Greek Revival style also found in the centerpiece of the plaza, the Old State House Museum. The music hall was added to the National Register of Historic Places in 2007, as the Joseph Taylor Robinson Municipal Auditorium. Additional meeting space complementing Robinson Center's offerings are located to the east of the Old State House, inside the Statehouse Convention Center.

The center is named for Joseph Taylor Robinson, a powerful former U.S. Senator and Congressman and Arkansas governor, and is one of several locations and facilities that bear his name.

The Robinson Center Music Hall and Conference Center is the primary performance space for the Arkansas Symphony Orchestra, traveling productions of popular Broadway plays and musicals, and various concerts throughout the year. It seats 2,222. It is programmed by Celebrity Attractions

The new conference center on the north-facing side of the building overlooks the Arkansas River. It features multiple meetings spaces, ballrooms and a terrace capable of hosting weddings, conferences and conventions for a wide variety of organizations.

Robinson Center is administered by the Little Rock Convention & Visitors Bureau, a city government division which maintains its primary offices inside the Cromwell Building across the plaza from the hall.

== See also ==
- List of concert halls
- National Register of Historic Places listings in Little Rock, Arkansas
