= Dolph Camp, Bussey and Peace Halls Historic District =

Historic district in Arkansas, United States

- U.S. National Register of Historic Places
- U.S. Historic district
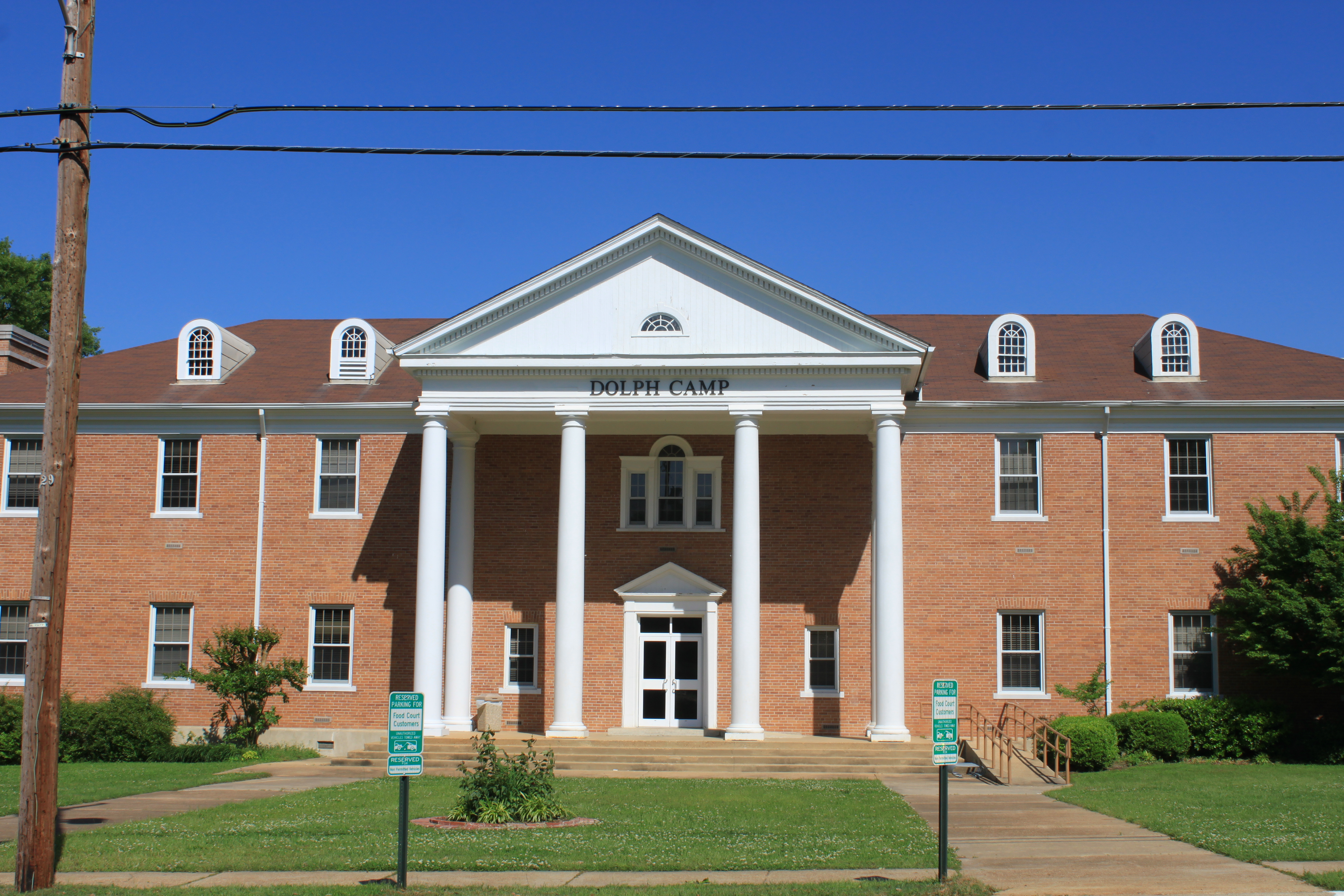

- Location within Arkansas Location within the United States
- Location: Southern Arkansas University Campus, south side of Lane Drive, Magnolia, Arkansas
- Coordinates: 33°17′26″N 93°14′3″W
- Area: 3.5 acres (1.4 ha)
- Built: 1950, 1951, 1957
- Architect: Wittenberg, Delony & Davidson
- Architectural style: Colonial Revival
- NRHP reference No.: 12001231
- Added to NRHP: January 29, 2013

The Dolph Camp, Bussey and Peace Halls Historic District encompasses three historic buildings on the campus of Southern Arkansas University in Magnolia, Arkansas. Dolph Camp, Bussey Hall, and Peace Hall are brick buildings constructed between 1949 and 1957, and are well-preserved local examples of academic Colonial Revival architecture. All three buildings were designed by Wittenberg, Delony & Davidson. The buildings were listed as a historic district on the National Register of Historic Places in 2013.

== Bussey Hall ==
Bussey Hall is a three-story brick structure built in 1949-50 as a girls dormitory, a function it still performs today. It is roughly U-shaped, with a main entrance sheltered by a three-story portico with triangular gable pediment supported by round columns. It is named for Mrs. Carol Bussey, the school dietitian and dining hall director 1913-56.

== Peace Hall ==
Peace Hall is a two-story brick structure built in 1951, originally serving as the university library. It has a hipped roof pierced by round-arch dormers, and a main entrance which is similar to that of Bussey Hall, although it is only two stories in height. It is named for Dr. James Peace, an English professor and librarian early in the school's history. The building was renovated in 1975 and converted to offices and classrooms, first for the business school, and more recently the Department of Behavioral and Social Sciences.

== Dolph Camp ==
Dolph Camp is a two-story brick structure built in 1957 to house the school's music department. Its main entrance is sheltered by a single-story portico supported by six columns. The triangular pediment has an elliptical window. It was extensively renovated in 2001, and now houses the university's information technology services department. It is named in honor of Dr. Dolph Camp, the university president at the time of its construction.

== See also ==
- National Register of Historic Places listings in Columbia County, Arkansas
