= President's House (Southern Arkansas University) =

Historic house in Arkansas, United States

- U.S. National Register of Historic Places
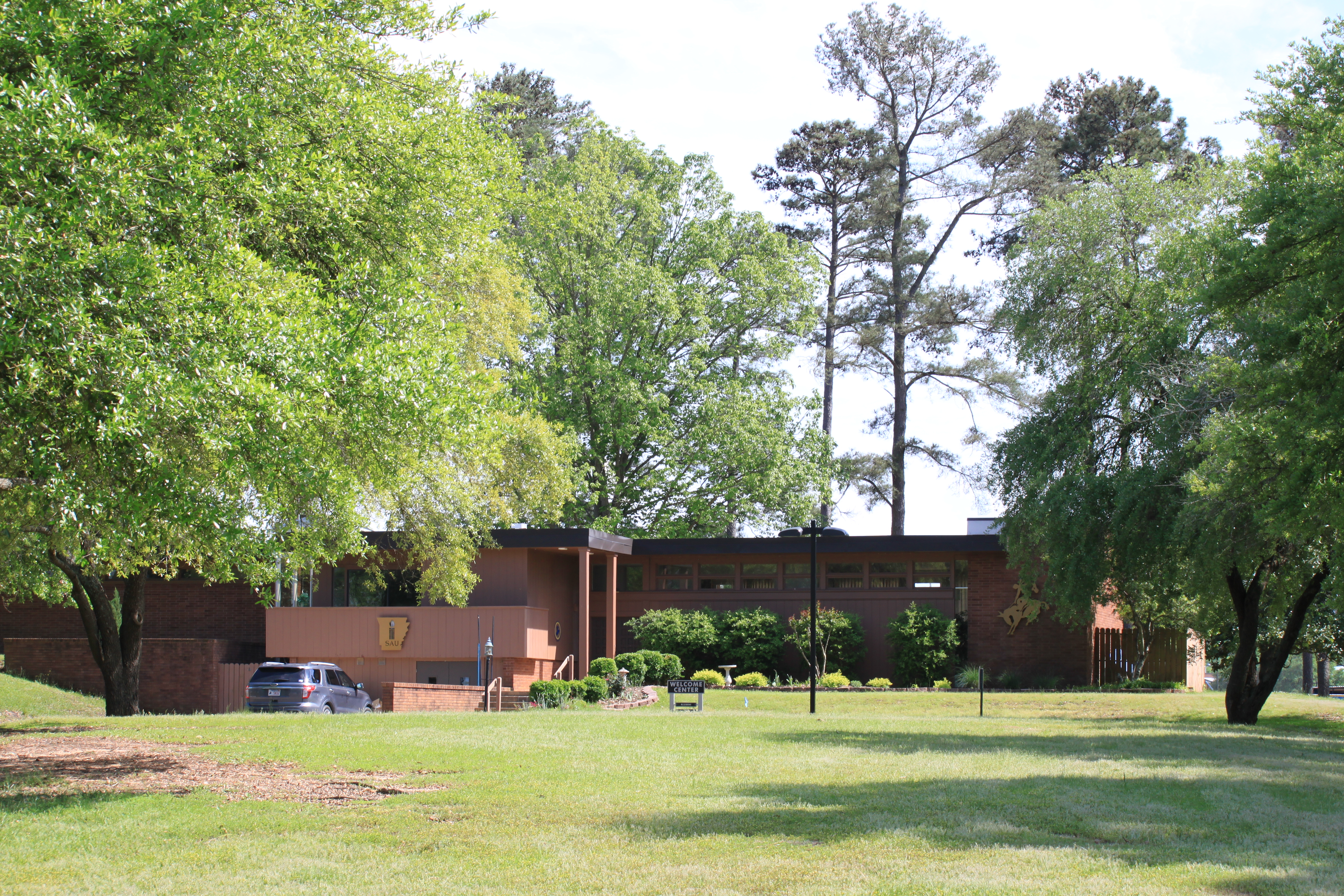

- Location within Arkansas Location within the United States
- Location: East Farm Road east of Washington Street, Magnolia, Arkansas
- Coordinates: 33°17′45″N 93°13′59″W
- Area: Less than one acre
- Built: 1958
- Architect: Wittenberg, Delony & Davidson
- Architectural style: Mid-Century Modern
- NRHP reference No.: 13000315
- Added to NRHP: May 28, 2013

The President's House is a historic building on the campus of Southern Arkansas University (SAU) in Magnolia, Arkansas. The single-story brick structure was designed in the Mid-Century Modern style by Wittenberg, Delony & Davidson, and built in 1958. The architectural style is a departure from the rest of the firm's work for SAU, which is predominantly Colonial Revival in character. The house is set north and east of the university's athletic fields, away from the main campus buildings. Its construction was begun under the tenure of Dr. Dolph Camp. It was used as the official residence of the university president until the summer of 2001, and has since 2003 housed the SAU Foundation.

The building was listed on the National Register of Historic Places in 1986.

== See also ==
- National Register of Historic Places listings in Columbia County, Arkansas
