= First National Bank Arena =

Arena in Jonesboro, Arkansas

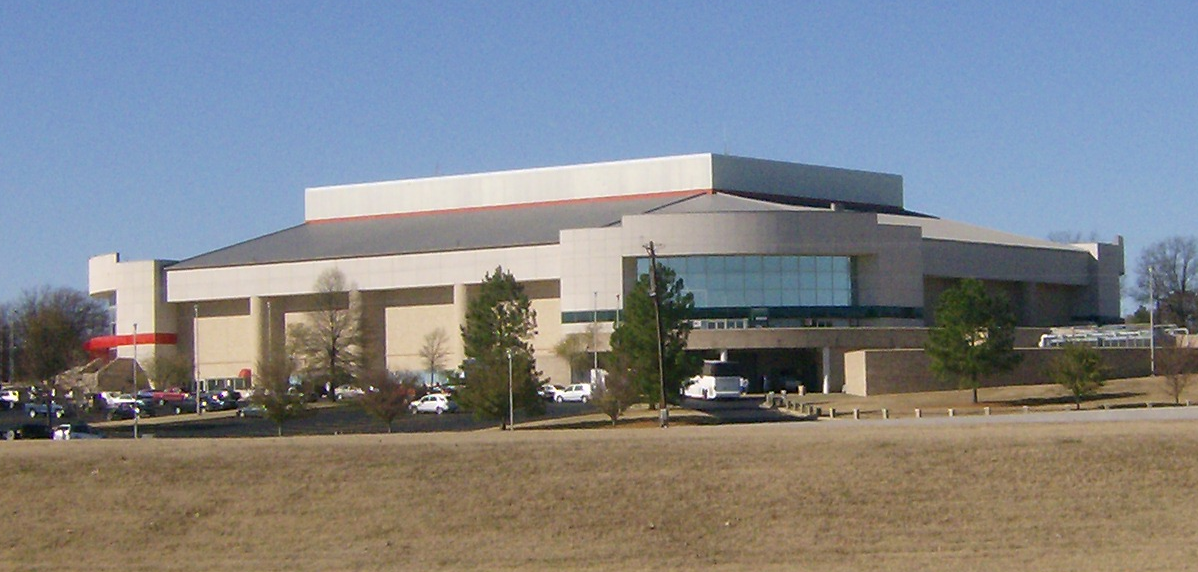
- Interactive map of First National Bank Arena
- Location: 217 Olympic Drive; Jonesboro, Arkansas 72401
- Coordinates: 35°50′43.52″N 90°40′13.15″W
- Owner: Arkansas State University
- Operator: Arkansas State University
- Capacity: 10,038 (basketball); 10,252–11,209 (concerts and events)
- Surface: Multi-surface

Construction
- Groundbreaking: 1984
- Opened: July 11, 1987
- Cost: $19 million ($53.8 million in 2025 dollars)
- Architect: Wittenberg, Delony & Davidson
- Structural engineer: Geiger Engineers

Tenant
- Arkansas State University Red Wolves (NCAA) (1987–present)

Website
- www.fnbarena.com

First National Bank Arena (originally called the Convocation Center until 2017) is a 10,038-seat multi-purpose arena located on the campus of Arkansas State University, and is home to their college basketball team, the Red Wolves.

First National Bank Arena has three separate public venues including a 217-seat Auditorium, a banquet/meeting room that can be divided into 3 smaller meeting rooms, and the main arena, which has permanent seating for 10,475. First National Bank Arena hosts hundreds of events each year in these three venues, and well over 100,000 people walk through its doors each year.

== History ==
The first event was the Class of 1987 commencement. Throughout the years, First National Bank Arena has been host to many superstars including George Strait, Dolly Parton, Garth Brooks, Alabama, Reba McEntire, Rascal Flatts, Taylor Swift, Keith Urban, Carrie Underwood, Jason Aldean and Eric Church in the last five years.

WWE held a live Raw event at First National Bank Arena on February 11, 2002. The Sun Belt Conference uses the versatile building to host the Indoor Track & Field Championships every other year. The building is home to Arkansas State University Men's & Women's Basketball as well as Women's Volleyball.

In 2009, the weight room was upgraded. The same thing happened the following year to the locker and media rooms. There are four visitor locker rooms, as well as smaller, official locker rooms throughout the building.

In 2012, the original scoreboard and sound system (from 1987) were replaced with four 25' × 12' HD video boards and a 28-speaker sound system. Also in 2012, an entirely new roof was installed, as well as upgrades to the Administrative Offices and Box Office.

== See also ==
- List of NCAA Division I basketball arenas
