= Gay Oil Company Building =

- U.S. National Register of Historic Places
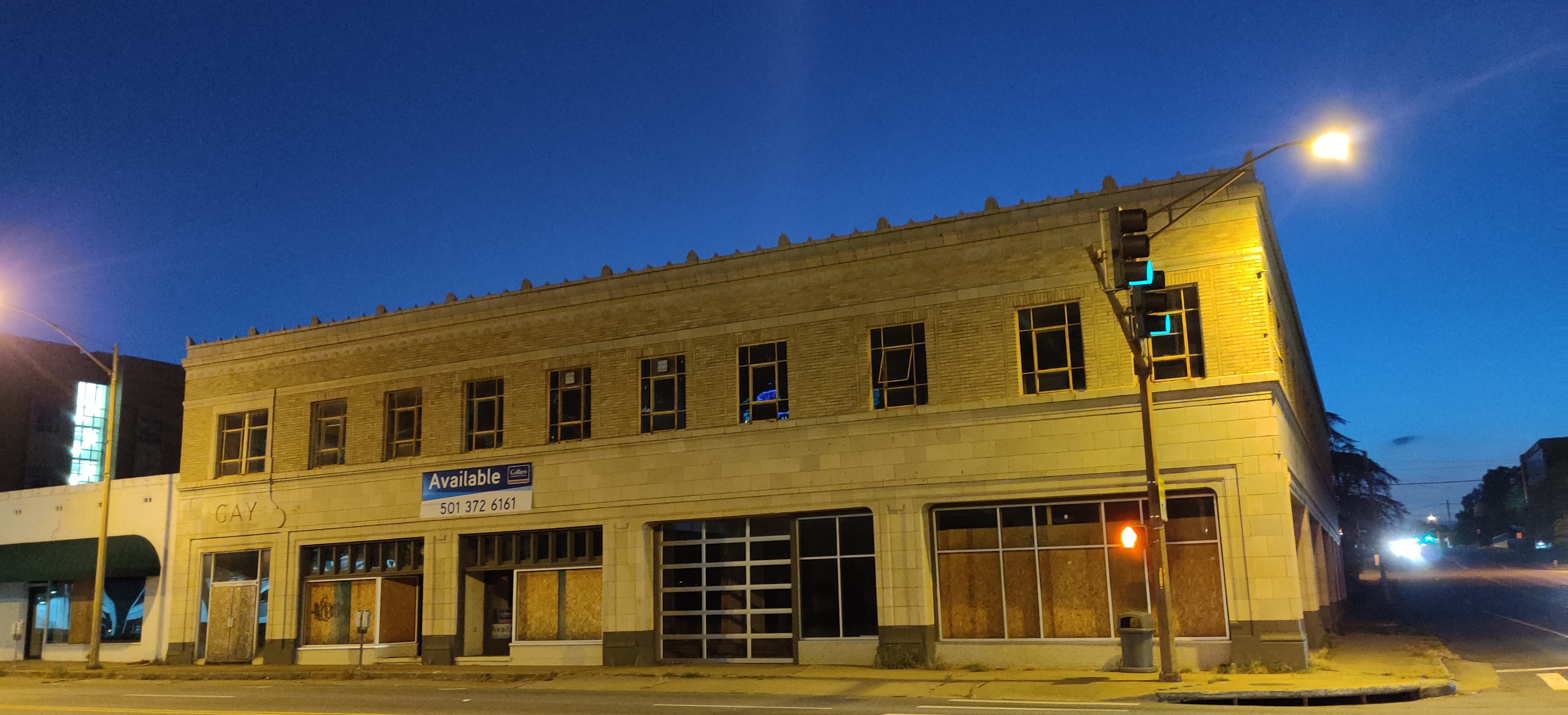

- Location within Arkansas Location within the United States
- Location: 300 S. Broadway St. Little Rock, Arkansas
- Coordinates: 34°44′48″N 92°16′32″W
- Area: less than one acre
- Built: 1925
- Architect: Wittenberg, Delony & Watts
- Architectural style: Classical Revival
- NRHP reference No.: 100001011
- Added to NRHP: June 5, 2017

The Gay Oil Company Building, is a historic commercial building at 300 South Broadway Street in Little Rock, Arkansas. It is a two-story brick building with Classical Revival styling. It was built in 1925 for Thomas Gay, founder of the Gay Oil Company, Little Rock's first oil company. The company's rise from its founding in 1907 mirrored the rise of the automobile as an important means of transportation.

The building was listed on the National Register of Historic Places in 2017.

== See also ==
- National Register of Historic Places listings in Little Rock, Arkansas
