= Empire Life Insurance Company of America Building =

- U.S. National Register of Historic Places
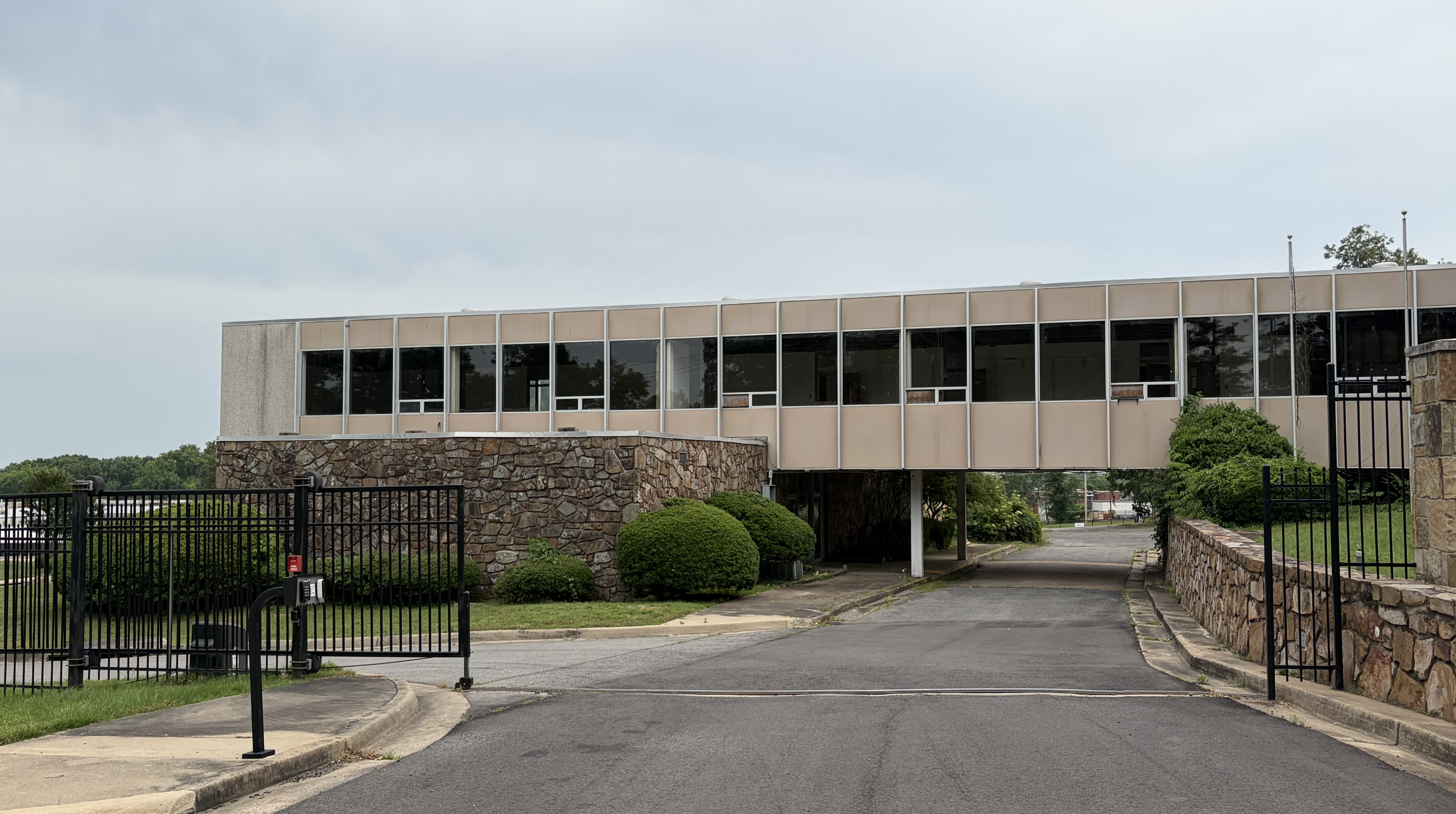
- The former Empire Life building in 2026

- Location within Arkansas Location within the United States
- Location: 2801 W. Roosevelt Rd., Little Rock, Arkansas
- Coordinates: 34°43′31″N 92°18′21″W
- Area: 9 acres (3.6 ha)
- Built: 1959
- Architect: Wittenberg, Delony & Davidson
- Architectural style: International
- NRHP reference No.: 100004002
- Added to NRHP: May 30, 2019

The Empire Life Insurance in America Building is a historic commercial building at 2801 West Roosevelt Road in Little Rock, Arkansas. It was built in 1959–60 to a design by the Little Rock firm of Wittenberg, Delony & Davidson, and is a significant local example of the International style of commercial design. It is a two-story structure of steel and concrete, predominantly faced in glass, aluminum, and fieldstone. The building was given an award by the regional branch of the American Institute of Architects in 1961.

The building was listed on the National Register of Historic Places in 2019.

== See also ==
- National Register of Historic Places listings in Little Rock, Arkansas
