= Julian Bunn Davidson House =

Historic house in Arkansas, United States

- U.S. National Register of Historic Places
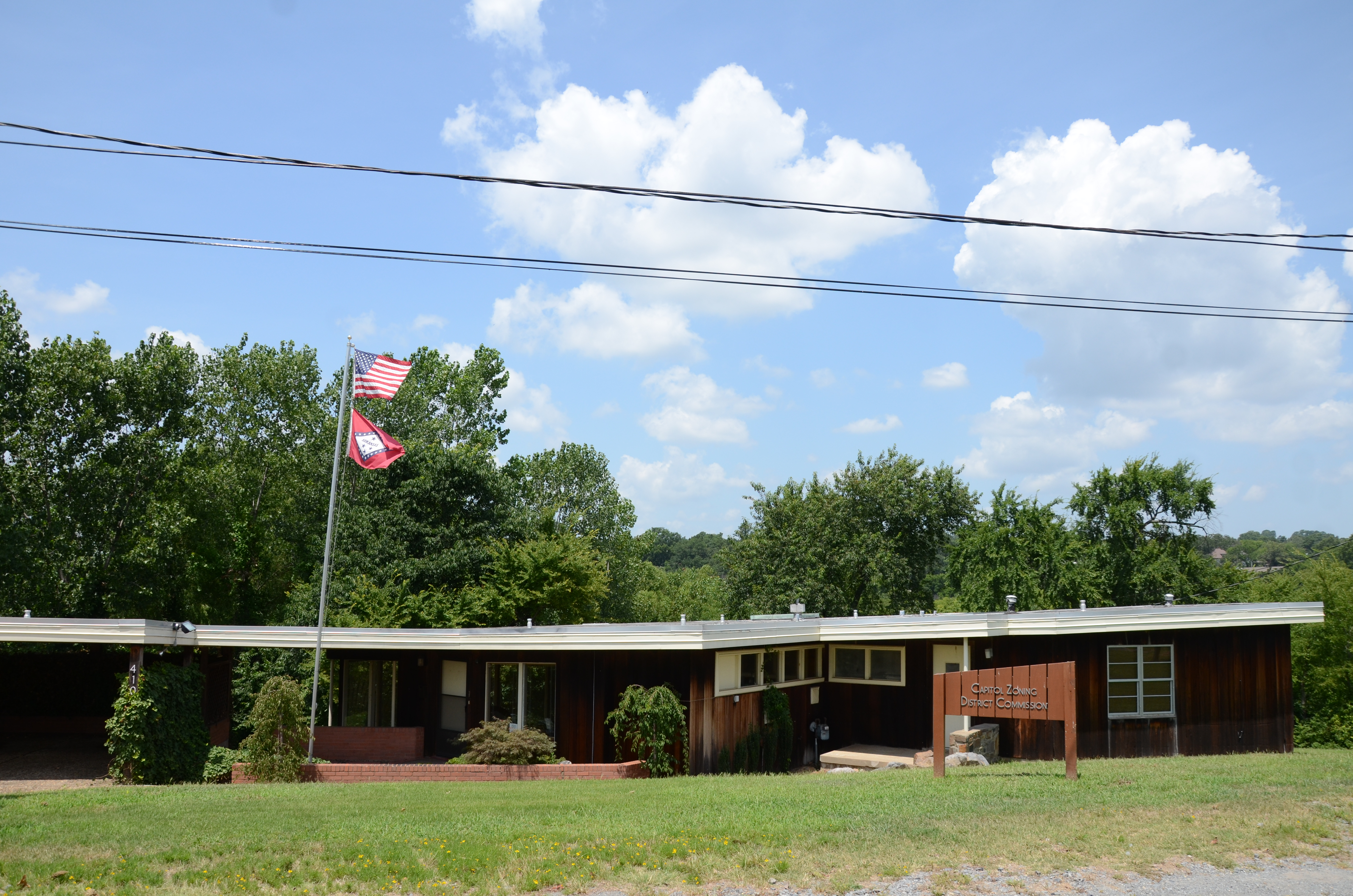

- Location within Arkansas Location within the United States
- Location: 410 S. Battery St., Little Rock, Arkansas
- Coordinates: 34°44′50″N 92°17′38″W
- Area: less than one acre
- Built: 1951
- Architect: Julian B. Davidson
- Architectural style: Mid-Century Modern
- NRHP reference No.: 13001105
- Added to NRHP: March 10, 2014

The Julian Bunn Davidson House is a historic house at 410 South Battery Street in Little Rock, Arkansas. It is the only formerly residential structure in Arkansas capitol district, currently housing state offices. It is a single-story Mid-Century Modern structure, designed by local architect Julian B. Davidson for his family and built in 1951. It is a high-quality example of the modern style, and the only one in this region of the city.

The house was listed on the National Register of Historic Places in 2014.

== See also ==
- National Register of Historic Places listings in Little Rock, Arkansas
