= Thomas Gray House =

Historic house in Arkansas, United States

- U.S. National Register of Historic Places
- Location within Arkansas Location within the United States
- Location: 25 River Valley Rd., Little Rock, Arkansas
- Coordinates: 34°47′26″N 92°22′56″W
- Area: less than one acre
- Built: 1963
- Architect: Thomas A. Gray
- Architectural style: Mid-Century Modern
- NRHP reference No.: 100002955
- Added to NRHP: September 18, 2018

The Thomas Gray House is a historic house at 25 River Valley Road in Little Rock, Arkansas. It is a single-story masonry structure, finished in fieldstone and vertical cedar siding and covered by a gable-on-hip roof. A contemporaneous detached carport with a similar roof stands near the house. The house was designed by Thomas A. Gray, an architect at the prominent Little Rock firm Wittenberg, Delony & Davidson, as his family's residence. It is a locally significant example of the Organic architecture movement.

The house was listed on the National Register of Historic Places in 2018.

== See also ==
- National Register of Historic Places listings in Little Rock, Arkansas
