= Fred W. Parris Towers =

Historic residential building in Arkansas, United States

- U.S. National Register of Historic Places
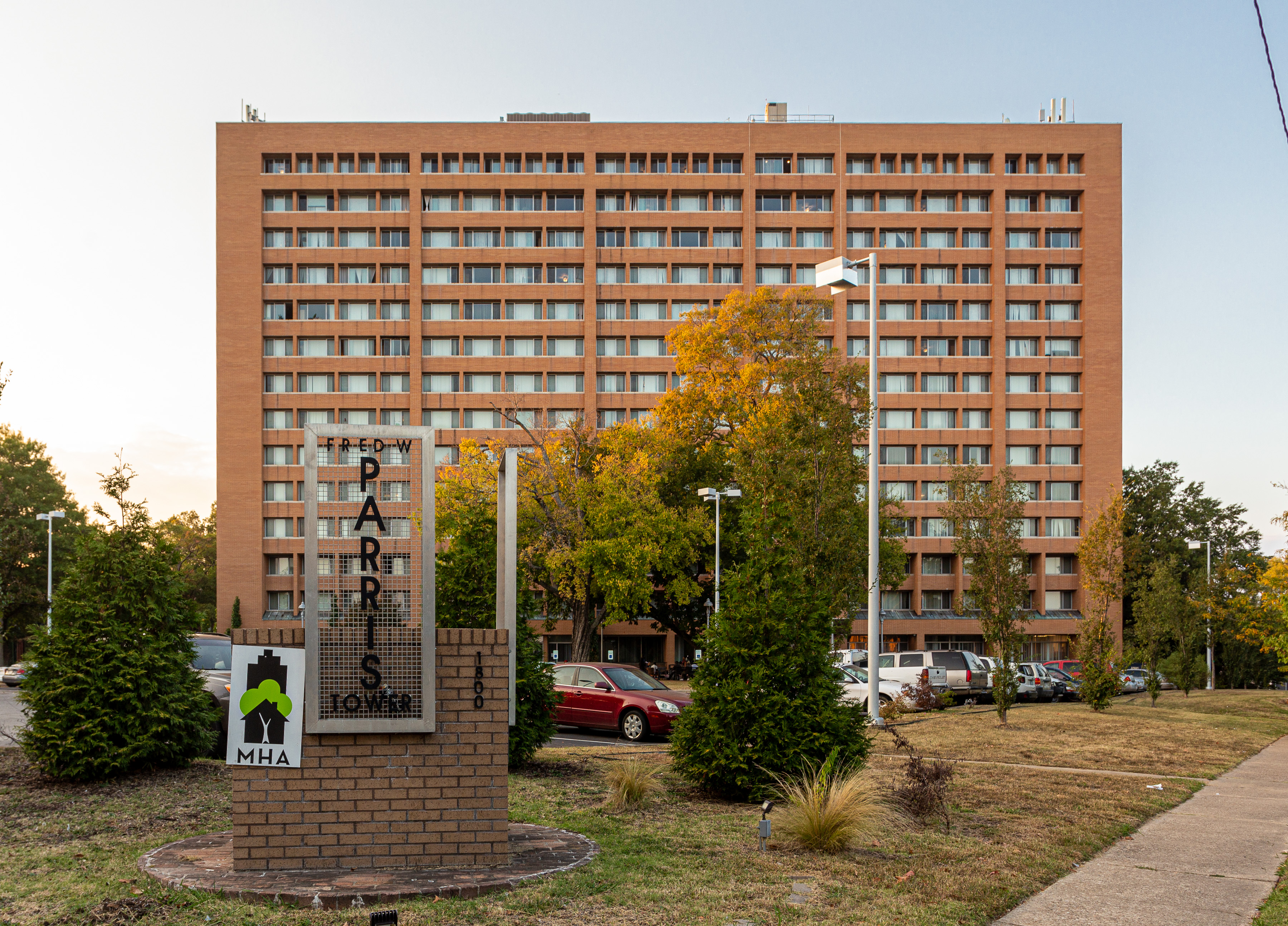

- Location within Arkansas Location within the United States
- Location: 1800 S. Broadway St., Little Rock, Arkansas
- Coordinates: 34°43′53″N 92°16′43″W
- Area: 3 acres (1.2 ha)
- Built: 1971
- Architect: Wittenberg, Delony & Davidson
- Architectural style: International Style
- NRHP reference No.: 100000707
- Added to NRHP: April 13, 2017

The Fred W. Parris Tower is a residential apartment highrise at 1800 South Broadway Street in Little Rock, Arkansas. Built in 1972, it is a fourteen-story skyscraper, with a steel frame clad in masonry, housing 253 residential units. It was designed by Wittenberg, Delony & Davidson for the city as public senior housing, and exemplifies a design principle espoused by Le Corbusier known as the "tower in the field", with a large landscaped green area surrounding the building.

The apartments were listed on the National Register of Historic Places in 2017.

== See also ==
- National Register of Historic Places listings in Little Rock, Arkansas
