= Simmons Tower =

Tallest skyscraper in the state of Arkansas

Simmons Bank Tower

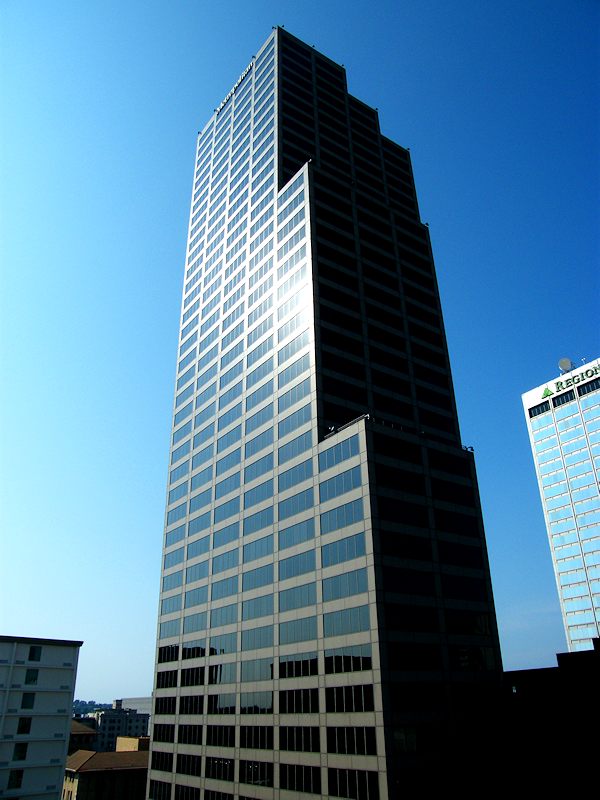
- Simmons Bank Tower in 2011
- Interactive map of the Simmons Bank Tower area

General information
- Status: Completed
- Type: Office, retail, restaurant
- Location: 425 West Capitol Avenue; Little Rock, Arkansas, USA
- Coordinates: 34°44′38″N 92°16′32″W
- Construction started: 1984
- Completed: 1986
- Opening: 1986
- Cost: $72 million
- Operator: Kelley Commercial Partners

Height
- Antenna spire: 547 feet (167 m)

Technical details
- Floor count: 40
- Floor area: 624,996 sq ft (58,064.0 m^{2})

Design and construction
- Architects: Harwood K. Smith; Wilkins Sims Architects
- Developer: John Flake
- Main contractor: Pickens-Bond Construction Company

Website
- simmonstowerlr.com

Simmons Bank Tower is a 40-story skyscraper located at 425 West Capitol Avenue in downtown Little Rock, Arkansas. At 547 feet (167 m) high, it is the tallest building in Arkansas.

== Construction ==
The new tower was born out of discussions between two ascending business executives, John Flake, a Little Rock real estate developer, and Jerry Maulden, president of Arkansas Power & Light (now Entergy). Construction began in 1984 on the $72 million building, and in 1986 the building was completed and dubbed The Capitol Tower. Currently, the namesake tenant, Simmons Bank, is headquartered in the tower with presence in various markets of Arkansas, Missouri, Kansas, and Tennessee. Kelley Commercial Partners, the current name of the development firm of the tower, performs the management and leasing of the tower, and the Doyle Rogers Company is the special asset manager.

The building was renamed Simmons Tower in April 2014.

== History ==
Once construction finished in 1986, the building was opened and named Capitol Tower. Upon completion it became the tallest building in Arkansas, taking the record by 92 feet (28 m) from its neighbor the Regions Center (formerly First National Bank Building) located across the street. The tower has held this record ever since.

Little Rock–founded international frozen yogurt chain TCBY moved into the tower and gained naming rights in 1991 and the building became known as TCBY Tower. TCBY would later move out of the tower after the company was sold in 2000, leaving the three floors they occupied vacant. The name was changed again in August 2004 when Metropolitan National Bank bought naming rights to the tower and moved its headquarters in the building, and it was renamed Metropolitan Tower. Metropolitan Bank added exterior lighting to the facade of the tower in 2005 which includes 400-watt flood lights that illuminate the sides of the tower along with LED lights that can be programmed to any color and are used to commemorate national holidays. Simmons Bank purchased Metropolitan National Bank in 2014 and renamed the tower.

The building has a 952-car parking garage across the street with a connecting skywalk to the tower lobby. Simmons Tower has 17 elevators and is equipped with antennas and satellite dishes on the roof that are used for radio and cell phone communication as well as by local network affiliates.

Timothy McVeigh scouted out the building as a possible bombing location prior to bombing the Murrah Building in Oklahoma City. He said in his authorized biography that he wanted to minimize non-governmental casualties, and decided against bombing the building after spotting a florist's shop on the ground floor.

== See also ==
- List of tallest buildings by U.S. state
