= Regions Center (Little Rock) =

- Interactive map of the Regions Center area

General information
- Status: Completed
- Type: Office/Retail/Restaurant
- Location: 400 West Capitol Avenue; Little Rock, Arkansas, USA
- Coordinates: 34.7451°N 92.2754°W
- Completed: 1975
- Opening: 1975

Height
- Antenna spire: 454.01 feet (138 m)
- Roof: 454.01 feet (138 m)

Technical details
- Floor count: 30

Design and construction
- Architect: Wittenberg, Delony & Davidson

Regions Center is a 30-story skyscraper located at 400 West Capitol Avenue in downtown Little Rock, Arkansas.

The structure was completed in 1975. 454 feet (138 m) tall, it was the tallest building in Arkansas when it was built, although it was later surpassed by the Simmons Tower in 1986. It is 30 stories tall, with floor space of 556,975 square feet. In 2006, Regions Bank sold the building to a limited liability company. In 2016, the structure was reported to be at 57% occupancy, with its tenants paying a combined $5 million in rent each month. The owners of the building entered bankruptcy proceedings in 2016, and Regions Center was sold to Taconic Capital Advisors in 2022. At the time, the building was valued by the county assessor at $30 million and was still occupied by Regions Bank.
