= Overstreet Hall =

- U.S. National Register of Historic Places
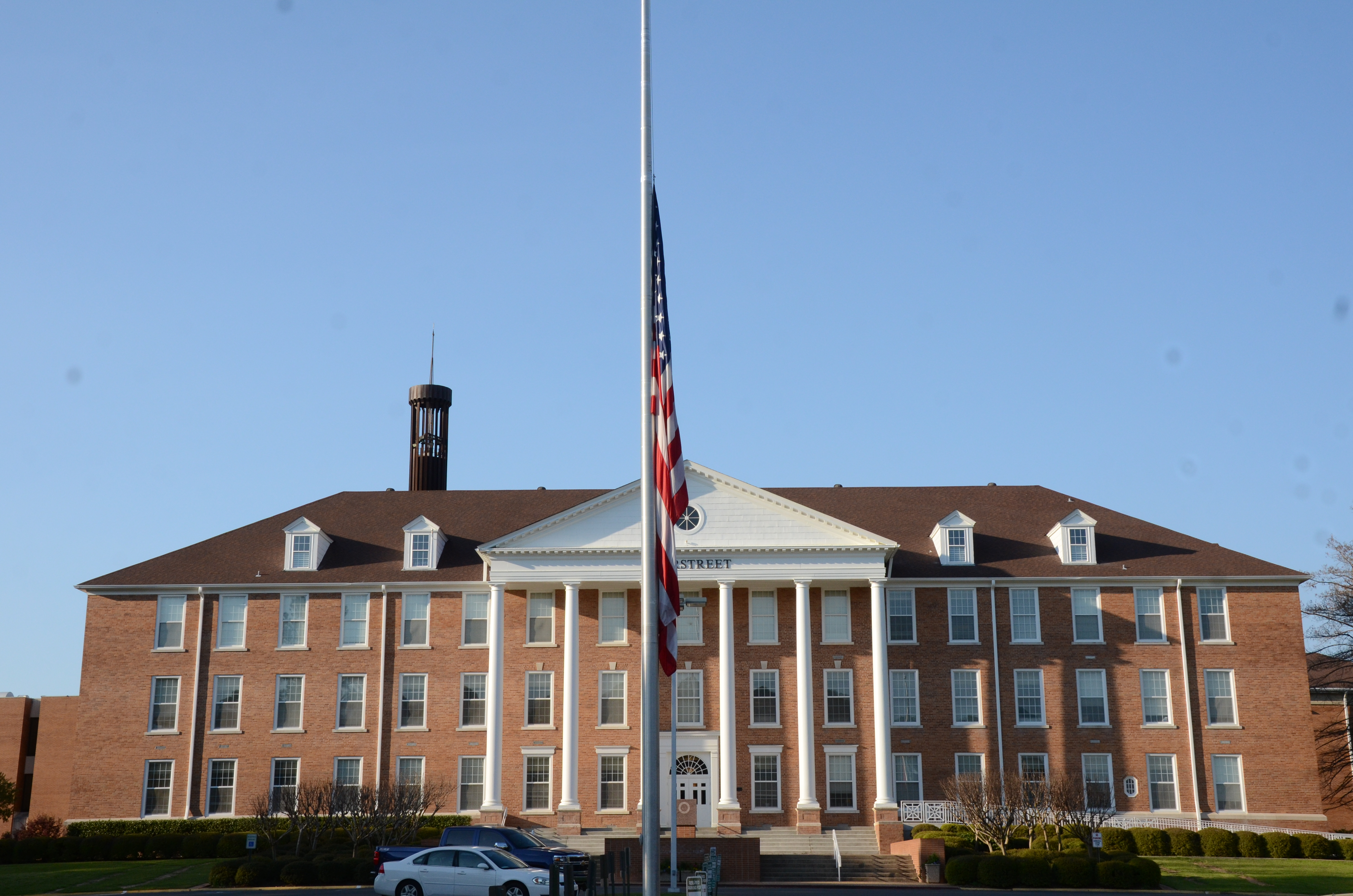

- Location within Arkansas Location within the United States
- Location: NW. of jct. of E. University & N. Jackson Sts., Southern Arkansas University campus, Magnolia, Arkansas
- Coordinates: 33°17′23″N 93°14′10″W
- Area: 1.5 acres (0.61 ha)
- Built: 1941
- Built by: Works Progress Administration
- Architectural style: Colonial Revival
- MPS: New Deal Recovery Efforts in Arkansas MPS
- NRHP reference No.: 15000992
- Added to NRHP: January 26, 2016

Overstreet Hall is a historic academic building on the campus of Southern Arkansas University in Magnolia, Arkansas. It is located at the junction of East University and North Jackson Streets, occupying a prominent visual position approaching the campus from the south. It is a three-story brick building with Colonial Revival features. It has a hip roof with dormers, and a Doric order six-column portico with pediments at the center of the main facade. It was built in 1941–43 with funding support from the Works Progress Administration. It currently houses the university's administrative offices.

The building was listed on the National Register of Historic Places in 2016.

== See also ==
- National Register of Historic Places listings in Columbia County, Arkansas
