= Theodore M. Sanders =

American architect (1879–1947)

- Born: March 13, 1879
- Died: May 10, 1947 (aged 68)
- Occupation: Architect
- Practice: Gibb & Sanders; Theo. M. Sanders; Sanders & Ginocchio; Thompson, Sanders & Ginocchio

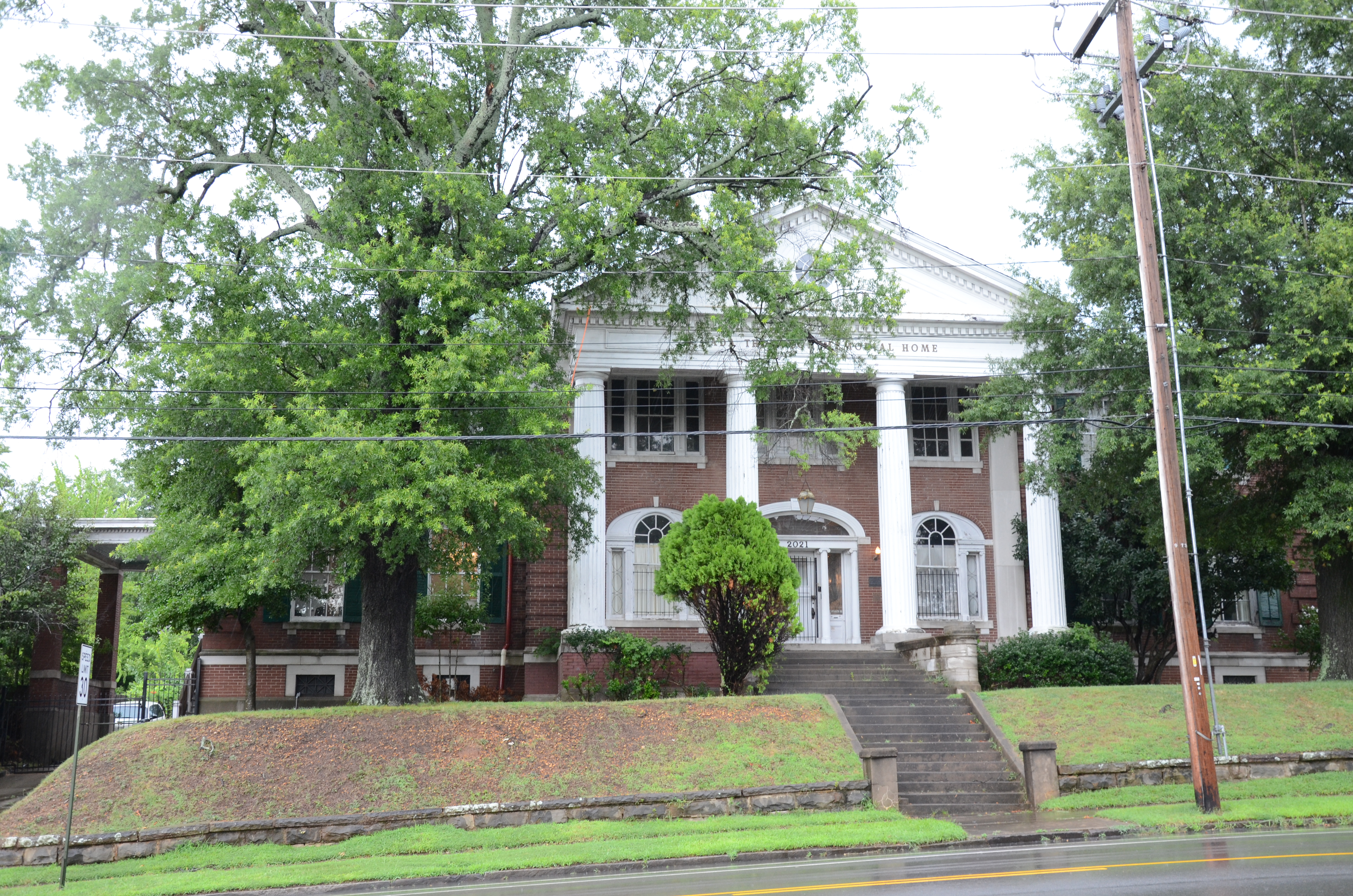
The former Ada Thompson Memorial Home in Little Rock, designed by Gibb & Sanders and completed in 1909.

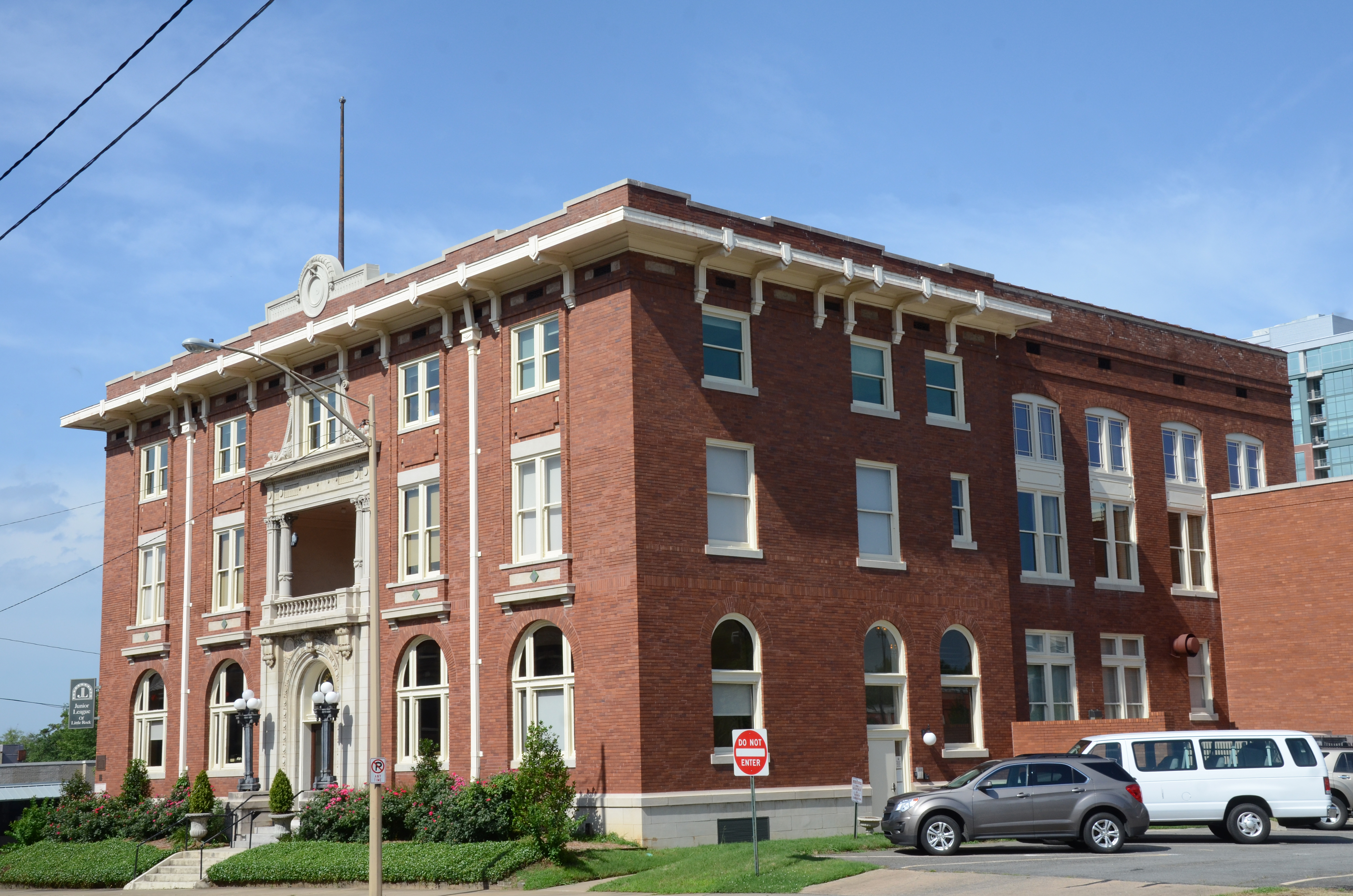
The former BPOE Elks Club in Little Rock, designed by Sanders and completed in 1912.

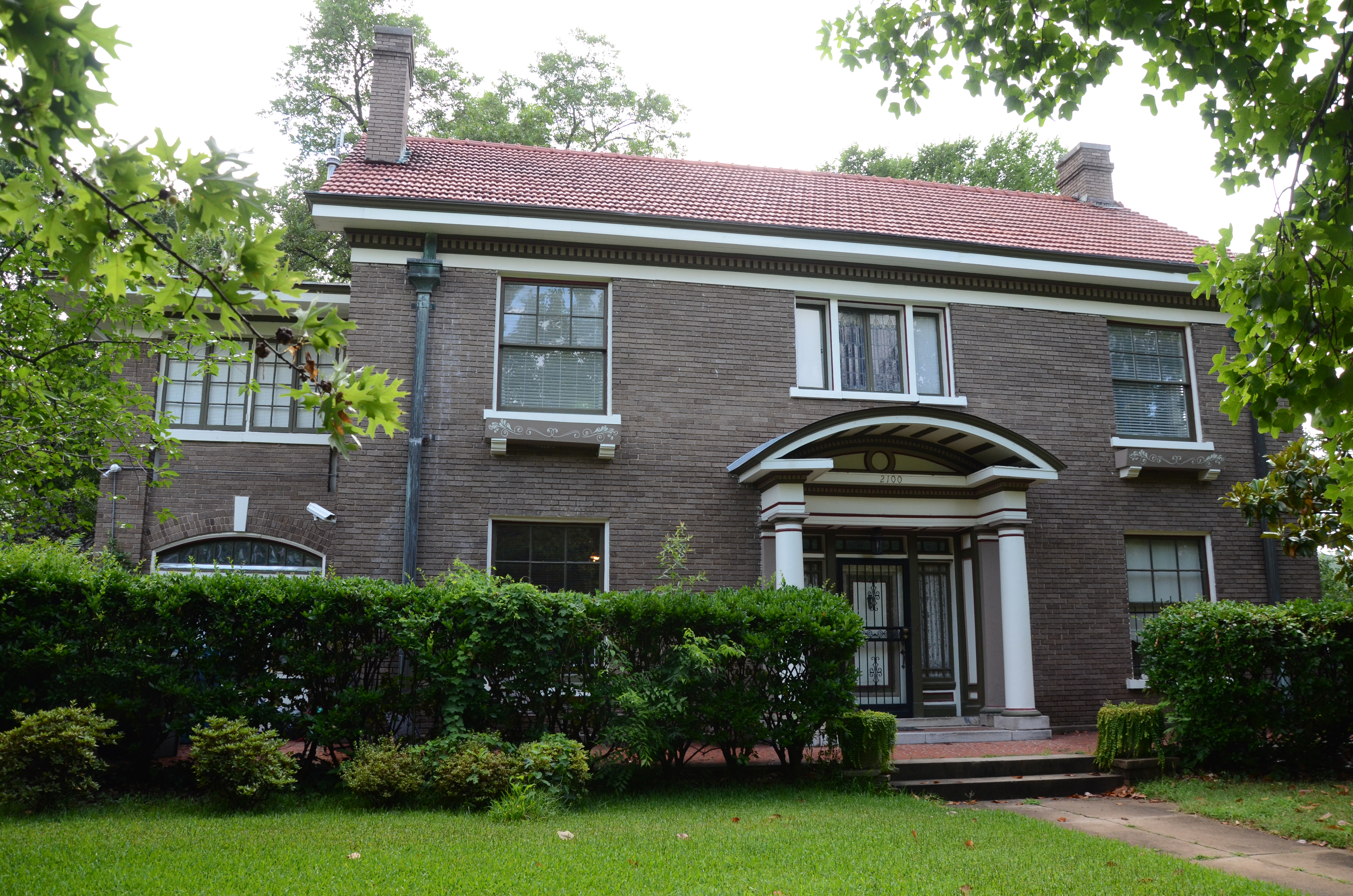
The Sanders House in Little Rock, designed by Sanders for his brother and completed in 1917.

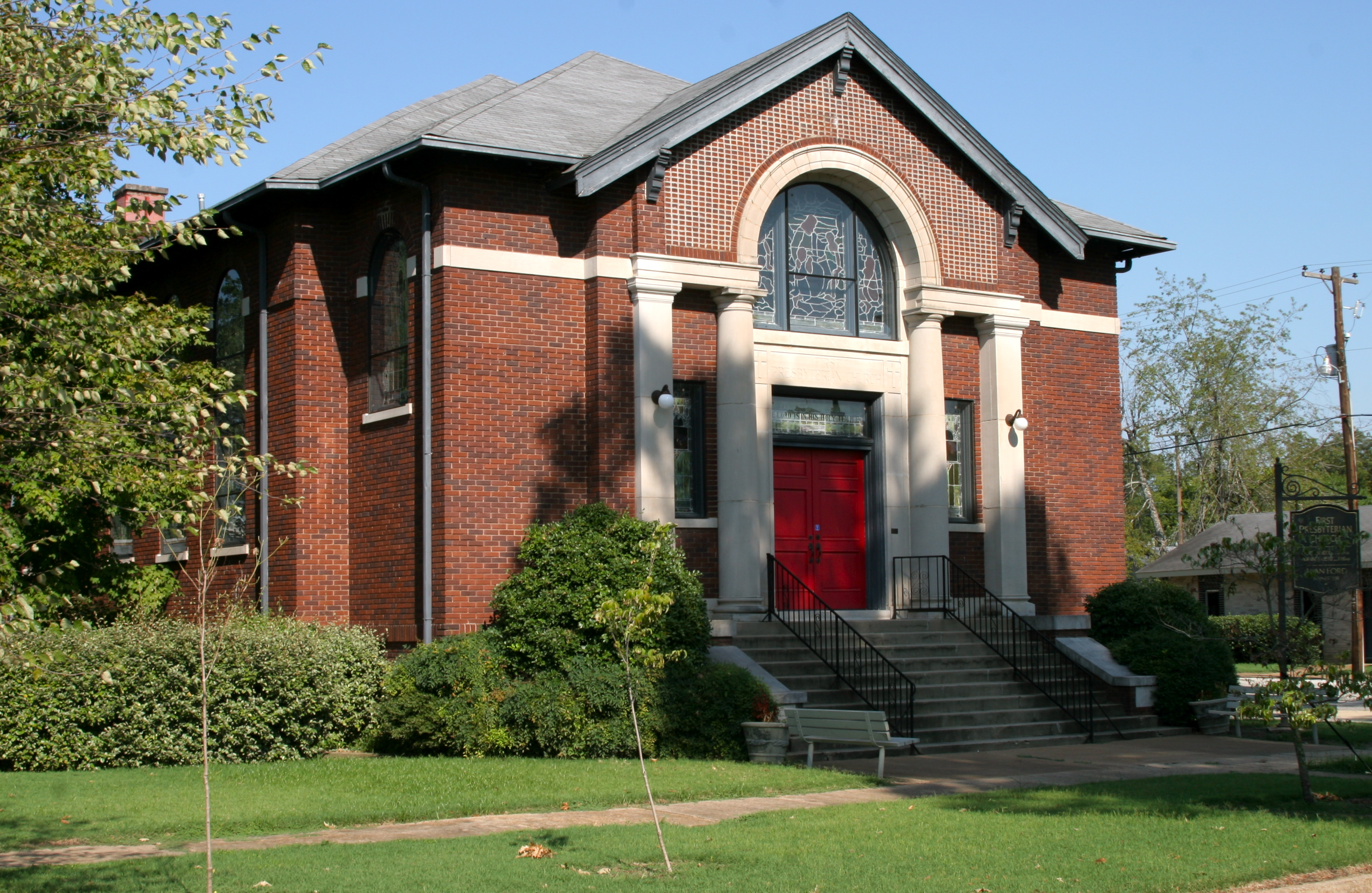
The First Presbyterian Church in Newport, designed by Sanders & Ginocchio and completed in 1923.

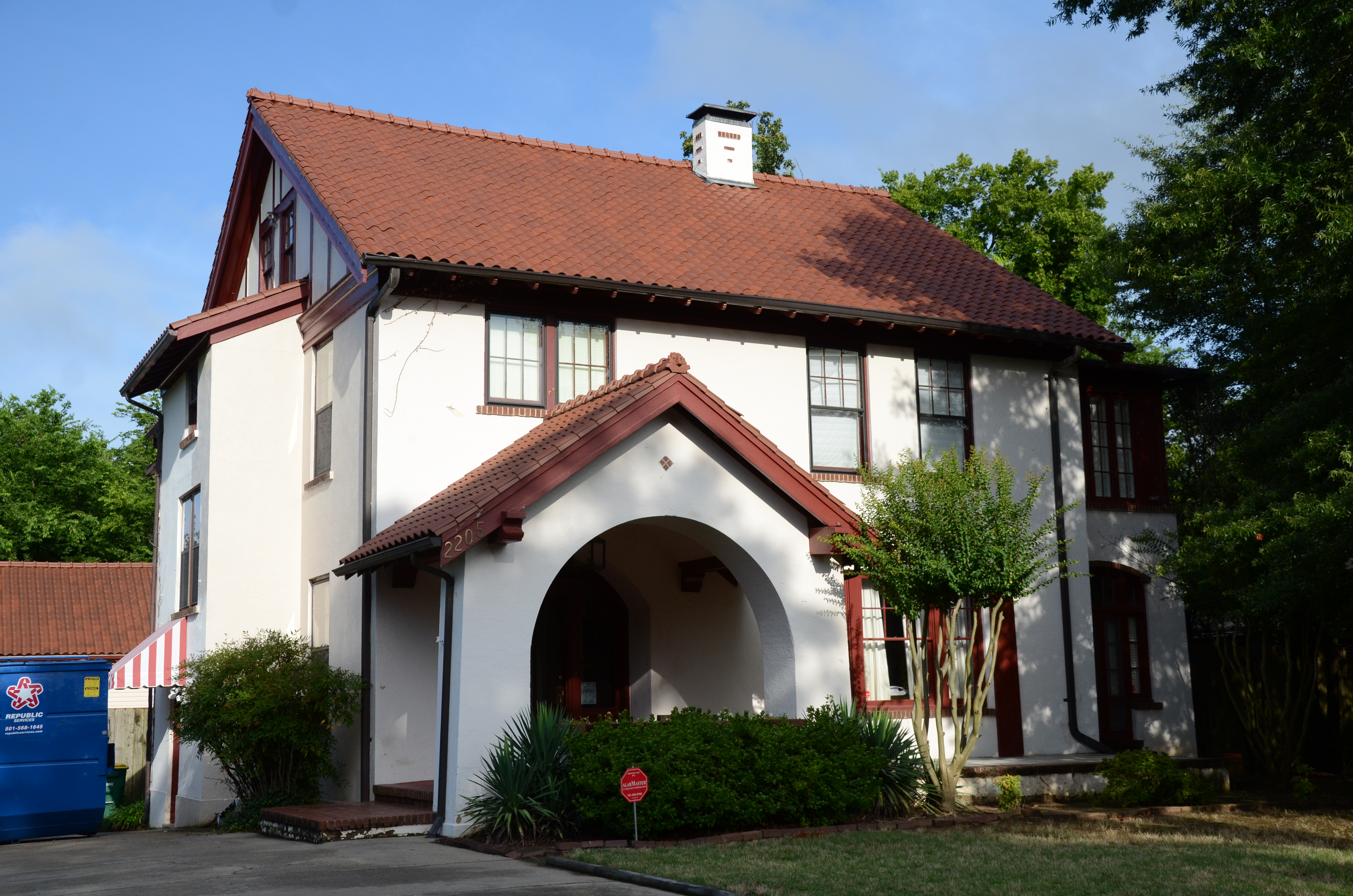
The Safferstone House in Little Rock, designed by Sanders & Ginocchio and completed in 1925.

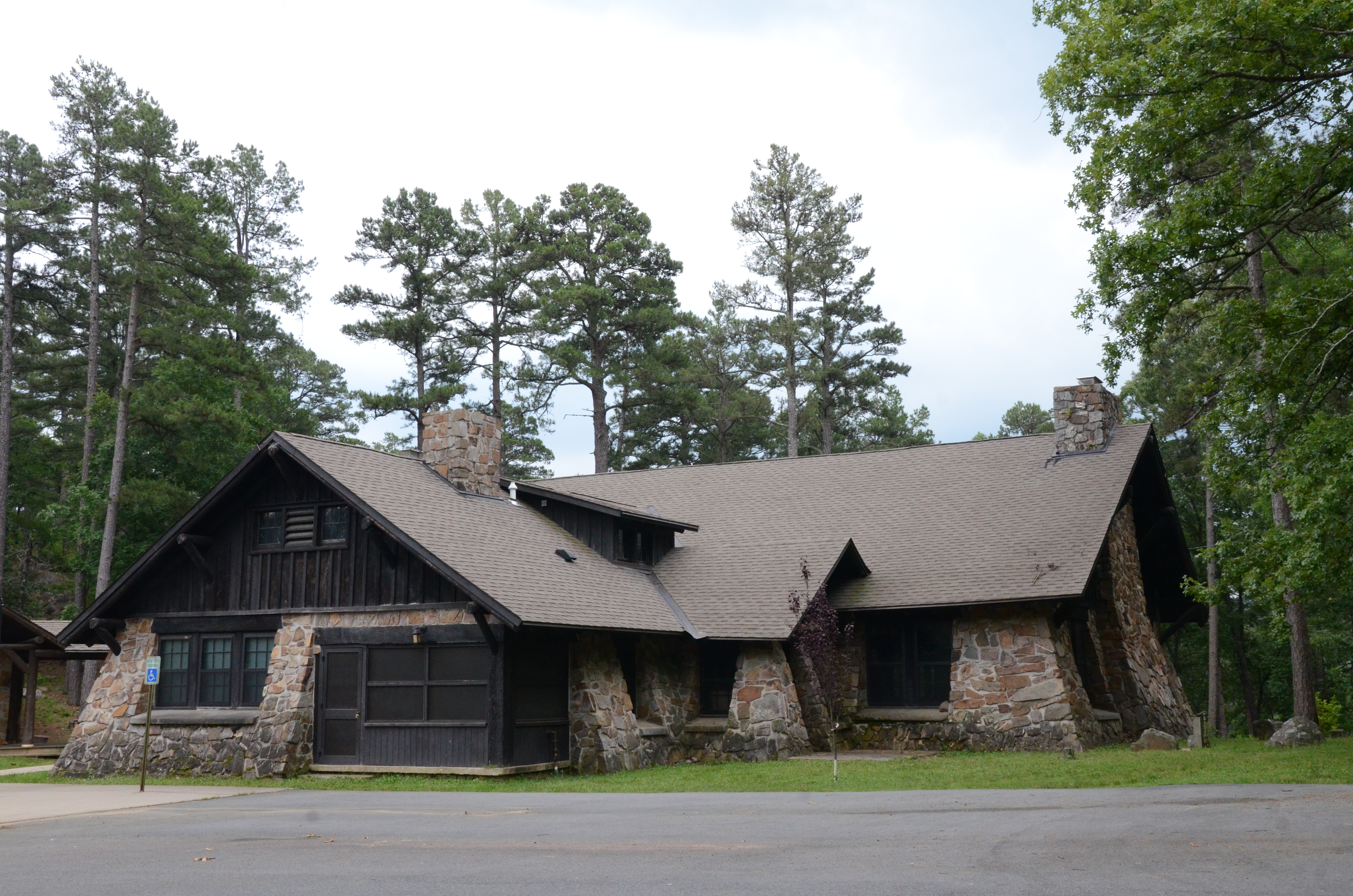
Ogden Hall of the Camp Ouachita Girl Scout Camp, designed by Thompson, Sanders & Ginocchio and completed circa 1938.

Theodore M. Sanders AIA (March 13, 1879 – June 10, 1947) was an American architect in practice in Little Rock, Arkansas from 1905 until his death in 1947. From 1927 to 1938 he was a partner of Charles L. Thompson, Arkansas' preeminent architect of the early twentieth century.

== Life and career ==
Theodore Marcus Sanders was born March 13, 1879 in Little Rock to Fred Sanders and Fannie Sanders, who were German immigrants. Sanders attended the Little Rock public schools and was educated at the University of Illinois, graduating in 1902 with a BS in architecture. He then joined the office of architect Frank W. Gibb in Little Rock, for whom he had worked between school terms. During the year 1904–05 he traveled in Europe, and upon his return formed the partnership of Gibb & Sanders with Gibb. The work of the partnership includes the Robert E. Lee School (1907) in Little Rock. The partnership was dissolved in 1909, and Sanders opened his own office.

In 1920 Sanders formed the partnership of Sanders & Ginocchio with Frank J. Ginocchio Jr. Ginocchio had also been educated at Illinois and had worked with Sanders for Gibb and for Charles L. Thompson. Sanders was the partner in charge of design, while Ginocchio was in charge of construction supervision and client services. Their work includes the First Presbyterian Church (1923) in Newport. In 1927 they merged their practice with that of Thompson, forming Thompson, Sanders & Ginocchio. Thompson had largely retired by the mid-1930s, and withdrew completely in 1938. Sanders & Ginocchio continued until Sanders also withdrew in 1941. Ginocchio continued the firm in partnership with Edwin B. Cromwell and Sanders returned to individual practice. His work was reduced by World War II but he continued to work until his death in 1947.

Sanders was a member of the American Institute of Architects (AIA) and was a charter member of the Arkansas chapter in 1921. He served the chapter in several roles including president.

== Personal life ==
Sanders' education was funded by his sister, Sophie, who had married Zadek Otto Solmitz, a wealthy German Jewish merchant. Sanders was married twice: first to Irene Pareira in 1907, who died in 1916, and second to Annette Joseph in 1921. He had two children with his first wife. Sanders was Jewish and was a member of the Congregation B’nai Israel and a director of the Jewish Welfare Agency, now the Jewish Federation of Arkansas. In 1937 he took in a foster son, Friedrich Cohn, who had fled the Nazi regime in Germany. Sanders died June 10, 1947 in Little Rock at the age of 68.

Sanders' nephew, Morris B. Sanders Jr., was an architect in New York City.

== Legacy ==
At least nineteen works designed by Sanders, independently and with Gibb and Ginocchio, but exluding with Thompson, have been listed on the United States National Register of Historic Places. Others contribute to listed historic districts.

== Architectural works ==
=== Gibb & Sanders, 1905–1909 ===
- 1906 – Union Station, (Note: NRHP-listed.) E. 4th Ave and State St, Pine Bluff, Arkansas
- 1907 – Robert E. Lee School, 3805 W 12th St, Little Rock, Arkansas
- 1909 – Ada Thompson Memorial Home, (Note: NRHP-listed. Also a contributing resource to the South Main Street Residential Historic District, NRHP-listed in 2007.) 2021 S Main St, Little Rock, Arkansas

=== Theo. M. Sanders, 1909–1920 ===
- 1910 – Fox House, 1303 S Olive St, Pine Bluff, Arkansas
- 1910 – Temple House, 1702 S Oak St, Pine Bluff, Arkansas
- 1911 – Cleveland County Courthouse, 20 Magnolia St, Rison, Arkansas
- 1911 – Williamson House, 325 Fairfax St, Little Rock, Arkansas
- 1911 – Woodruff School (former), (Note: A contributing resource to the Stifft Station Historic District, NRHP-listed in 2006.) 3010 W 7th St, Little Rock, Arkansas
- 1912 – BPOE Elks Club, 4th and Scott Sts, Little Rock, Arkansas
- 1914 – Hotel Freiderica, 625 W Capitol Ave, Little Rock, Arkansas
- 1915 – Adler House, 292 Boswell St, Batesville, Arkansas
- 1917 – Cornish House, 1800 Arch St, Little Rock, Arkansas
- 1917 – Sanders House, (Note: The home of Morris B. Sanders, Sanders' brother. NRHP-listed.) 2100 Gaines St, Little Rock, Arkansas
- 1918 – Dondy Building, (Note: Demolished. Formerly NRHP-listed.) 154 S. Third Batesville, Arkansas

=== Sanders & Ginocchio, 1920–1927 and 1938–1941 ===
- 1920 – Gregg House, 412 Pine St, Newport, Arkansas
- 1920 – Hamp Williams Building, 500-504 Ouachita Ave, Hot Springs, Arkansas
- 1923 – First Presbyterian Church, 4th and Main Sts, Newport, Arkansas
- 1923 – Hall Building, (Note: A contributing resource to the Capitol–Main Historic District, NRHP-listed in 2012.) 201 W Capitol Ave, Little Rock, Arkansas
- 1924 – Democrat Printing & Lithograph Co. Building, 14-122 E 2nd St, Little Rock, Arkansas
- 1925 – Frauenthal & Schwarz Building, 824 Front St, Conway, Arkansas
- 1925 – Healey and Roth Mortuary Building, 815 Main, Little Rock, Arkansas
- 1925 – Safferstone House, 2205 Arch St, Little Rock, Arkansas
- 1925 – Snyder House, 4004 S Lookout, Little Rock, Arkansas
- 1940 – Cohn Building, 510 S Main St, Little Rock, Arkansas
- No date – D. C. Gates house, (Note: A contributing resource to the Charlotte Street Historic District, NRHP-listed in 1987.) 609 Charlotte St, Fordyce, Arkansas

=== Thompson, Sanders & Ginocchio, 1927–1938 ===
- See Charles L. Thompson.
