= Democrat Printing & Lithograph Co. Building =

- U.S. National Register of Historic Places
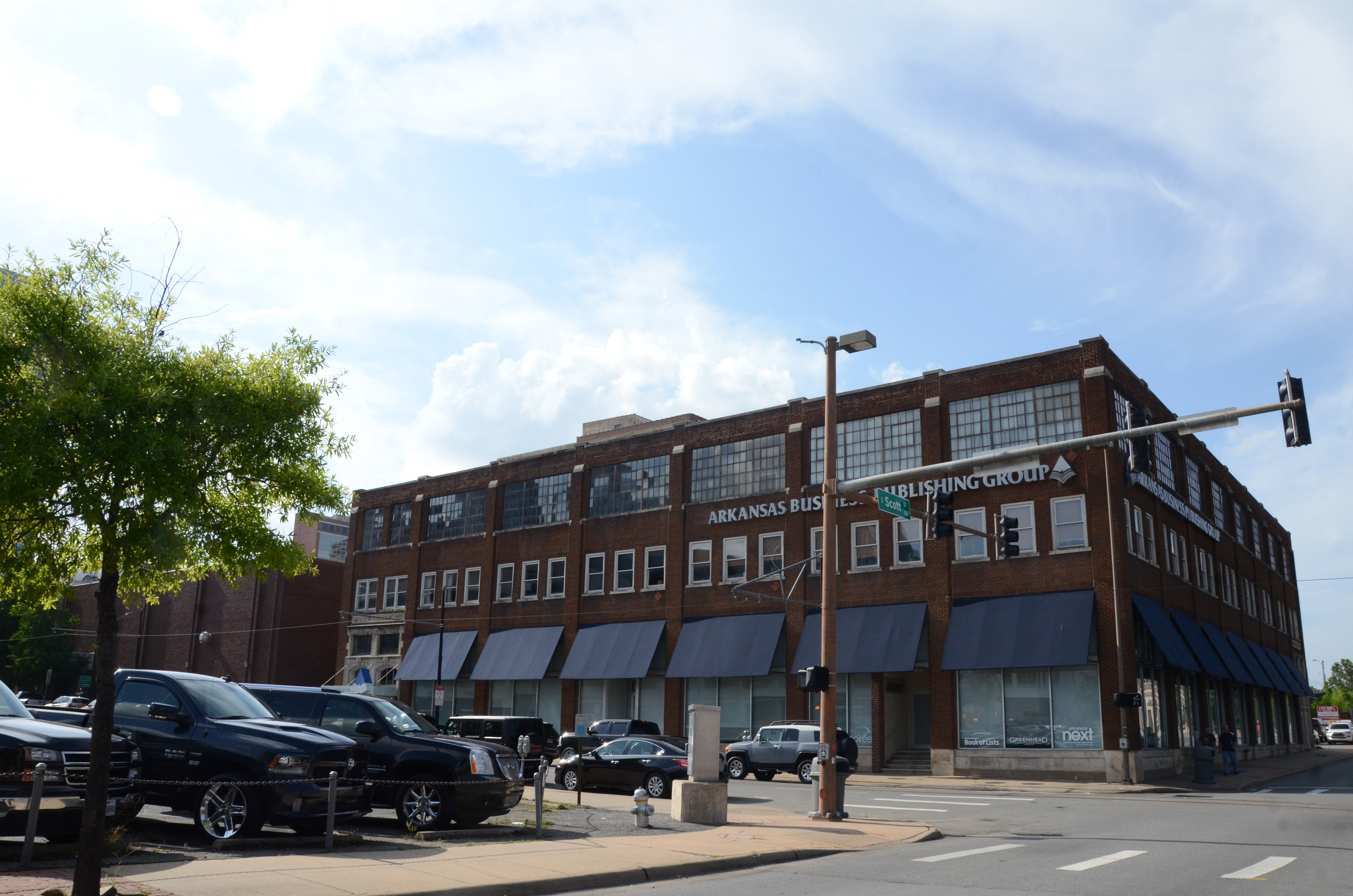

- Location within Arkansas Location within the United States
- Location: 114-122 E. Second St., Little Rock, Arkansas
- Coordinates: 34°44′50″N 92°16′10″W
- Area: less than one acre
- Built: 1924
- Architect: Sanders & Ginocchio
- MPS: Thompson, Charles L., Design Collection TR
- NRHP reference No.: 87001547
- Added to NRHP: December 17, 1998

The Democrat Printing & Lithograph Co. Building is a historic commercial building at 114-122 East Second Street in Little Rock, Arkansas. It is a roughly square brick building with limestone detailing, three stories in height, built in 1924 to a design by the architectural firm of Sanders & Ginocchio. Its street-facing facades are articulated by brick piers with limestone caps, with plate glass windows on the first floor, groups of three sash windows on the second, and large multi-paned windows on the third.

The building was listed on the National Register of Historic Places in 1998. It is along with the adjacent Beal-Burrow Dry Goods Building currently being used as a multifamily residential complex.

== See also ==
- National Register of Historic Places listings in Little Rock, Arkansas
