= First Presbyterian Church (Newport, Arkansas) =

Historic church in Arkansas, United States

- U.S. National Register of Historic Places
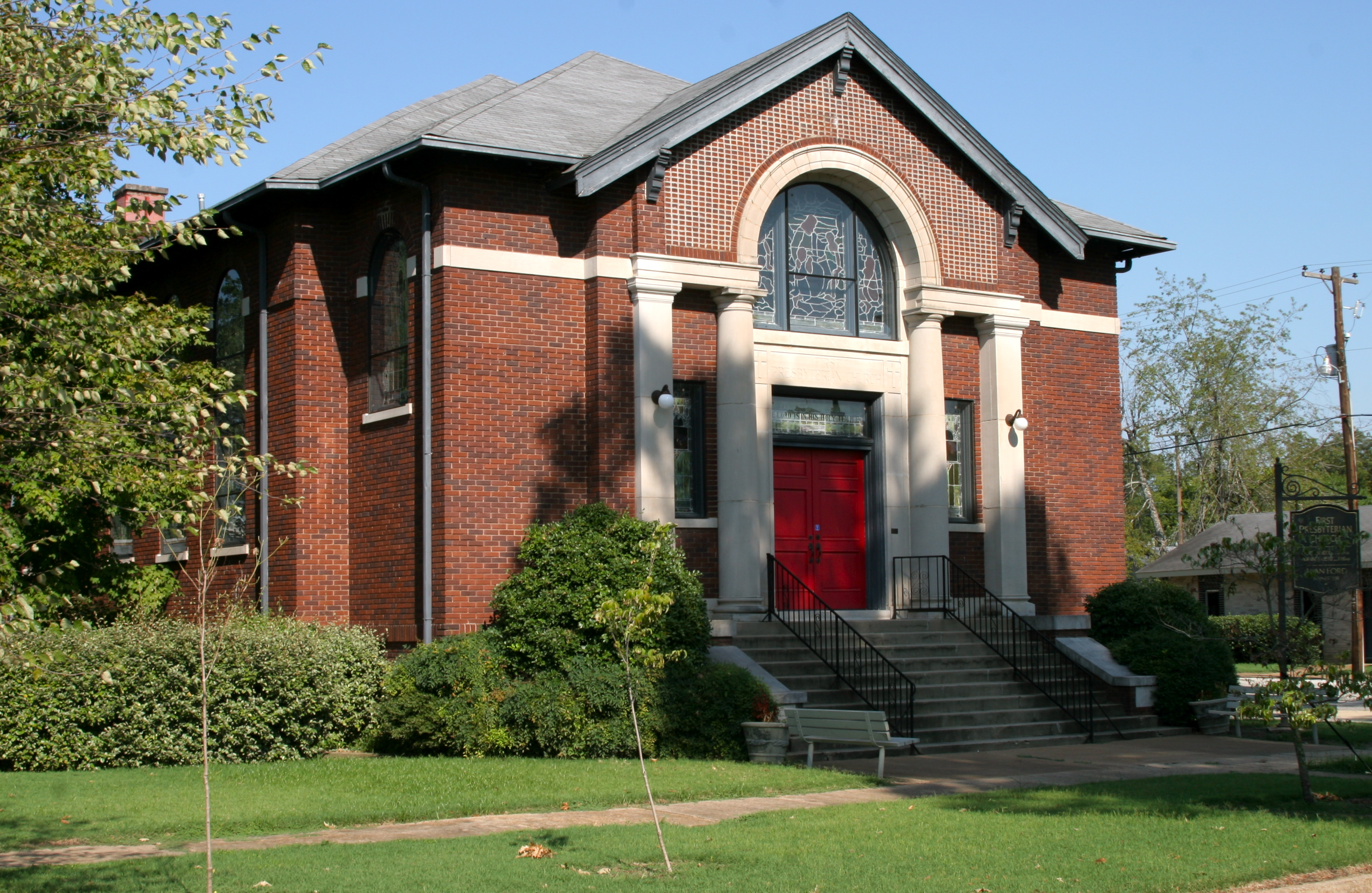

- Location within Arkansas Location within the United States
- Location: 4th and Main Sts., Newport, Arkansas
- Coordinates: 35°36′12″N 91°16′55″W
- Area: less than one acre
- Built: 1910
- Architect: Sanders & Ginocchio
- Architectural style: Classical Revival
- MPS: Thompson, Charles L., Design Collection TR
- NRHP reference No.: 82000837
- Added to NRHP: December 22, 1982

The First Presbyterian Church is a historic church building at 4th and Main Streets in Newport, Arkansas It was designed by architects Sanders & Ginocchio in Classical Revival style and built in 1910. It is a single-story brick structure, with a shallow hip roof over its main hall. The entrance is set in a slightly projecting gable-ended section, flanked by Tuscan columns and square pilasters.

The building was listed on the National Register of Historic Places in 1982.

== See also ==
- National Register of Historic Places listings in Jackson County, Arkansas
