= Cornish House (Little Rock, Arkansas) =

Historic house in Arkansas, United States

- U.S. National Register of Historic Places
- U.S. Historic district – Contributing property
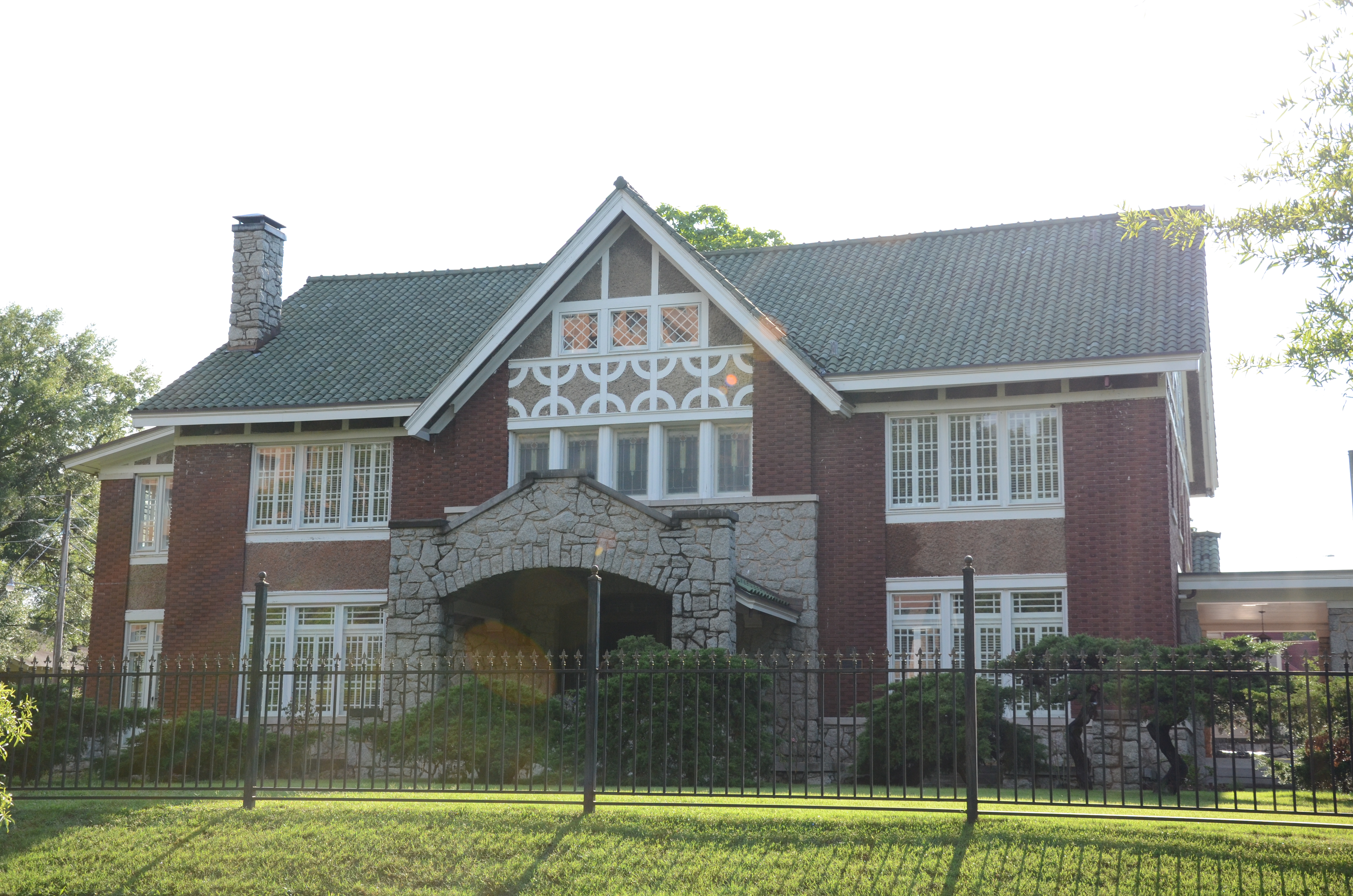

- Location within Arkansas Location within the United States
- Location: 1800 Arch St., Little Rock, Arkansas
- Coordinates: 34°43′52″N 92°16′47″W
- Area: less than one acre
- Built: 1917
- Architect: Theodore Sanders
- Architectural style: Bungalow/craftsman, Tudor Revival
- Part of: Governor's Mansion Historic District (ID88000631)
- MPS: Thompson, Charles L., Design Collection TR
- NRHP reference No.: 82000882

Significant dates
- Added to NRHP: December 22, 1982
- Designated CP: May 19, 1988

The Cornish House is a historic house at 1800 Arch Street in Little Rock, Arkansas. It is a 2 1/2-story brick structure, with a side gable roof, and a project center gable at the front, sheltering a porch with granite balustrade and posts. A porte-cochere extends north of the building, and a sunroom south. The house was built in 1917 to a design by noted Arkansas architect Theodore Sanders, and is a well-preserved local example of Tudor Revival architecture.

The house was listed on the National Register of Historic Places in 1982.

== See also ==
- National Register of Historic Places listings in Little Rock, Arkansas
