= Holcomb Court Apartments =

- U.S. National Register of Historic Places
- U.S. Historic district – Contributing property
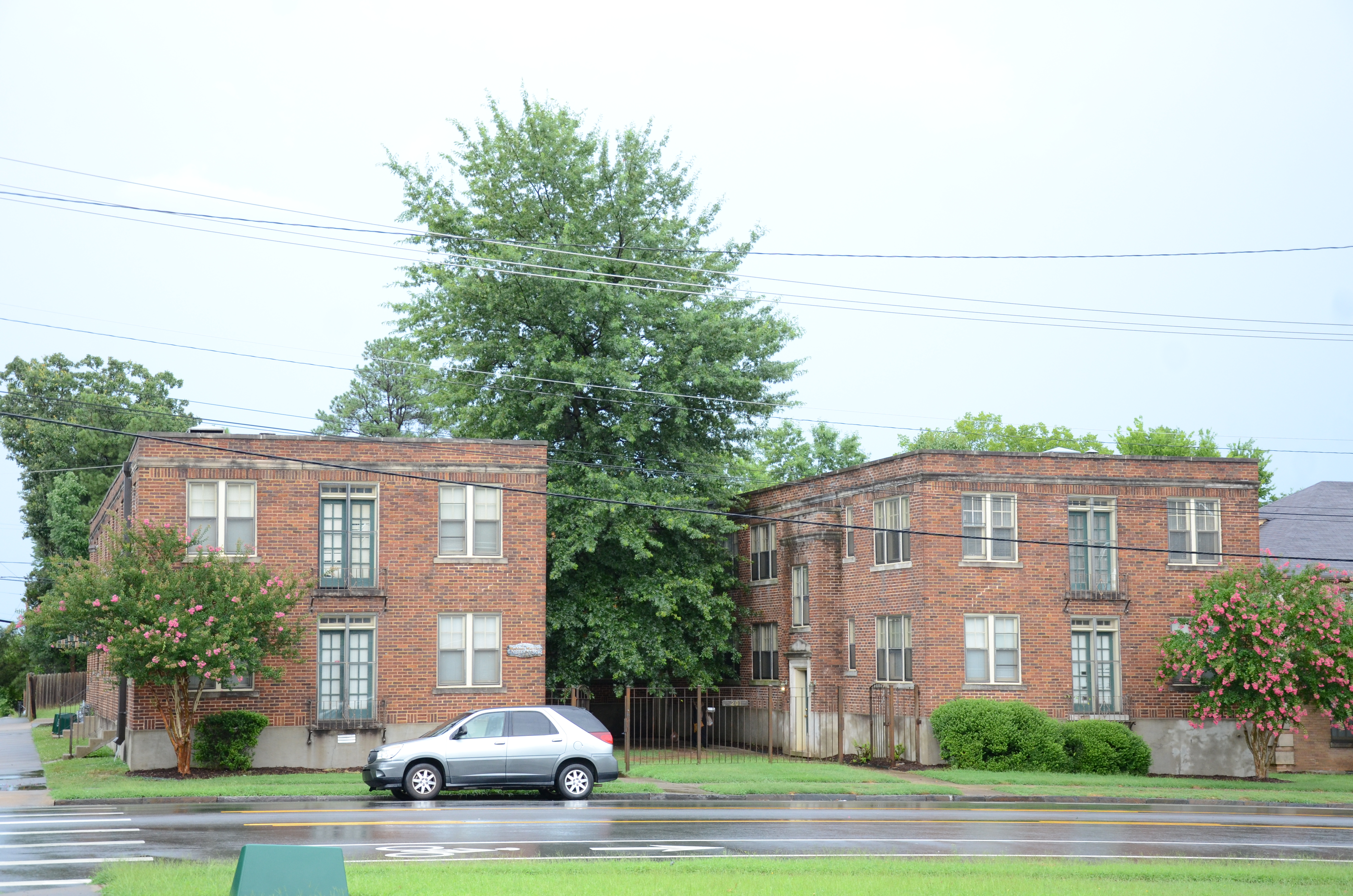

- Location within Arkansas Location within the United States
- Location: 2201 Main St., Little Rock, Arkansas
- Coordinates: 34°43′39″N 92°16′24″W
- Area: less than one acre
- Built: 1925
- Architectural style: Bungalow/craftsman
- Part of: South Main Street Residential Historic District (ID07000436)
- MPS: Little Rock Apartment Buildings MPS
- NRHP reference No.: 95000377

Significant dates
- Added to NRHP: April 7, 1995
- Designated CP: July 12, 2007

The Holcomb Court Apartments also called Martin, Mahlon Aparatments, are a historic apartment complex at 2201 Main Street in Little Rock, Arkansas. It is a U-shaped two story brick building, with concrete trim and a parapetted flat roof. Entrances are located on the courtyard side of the side wings, in projecting sections with pedimented concrete surrounds. The building houses twenty units, with many original design features surviving. Built in 1925, it is one of the city's few largescale apartment buildings built during the 1920s.

The building was listed on the National Register of Historic Places in 1995.

== See also ==
- National Register of Historic Places listings in Little Rock, Arkansas
