= Hamp Williams Building =

- U.S. National Register of Historic Places
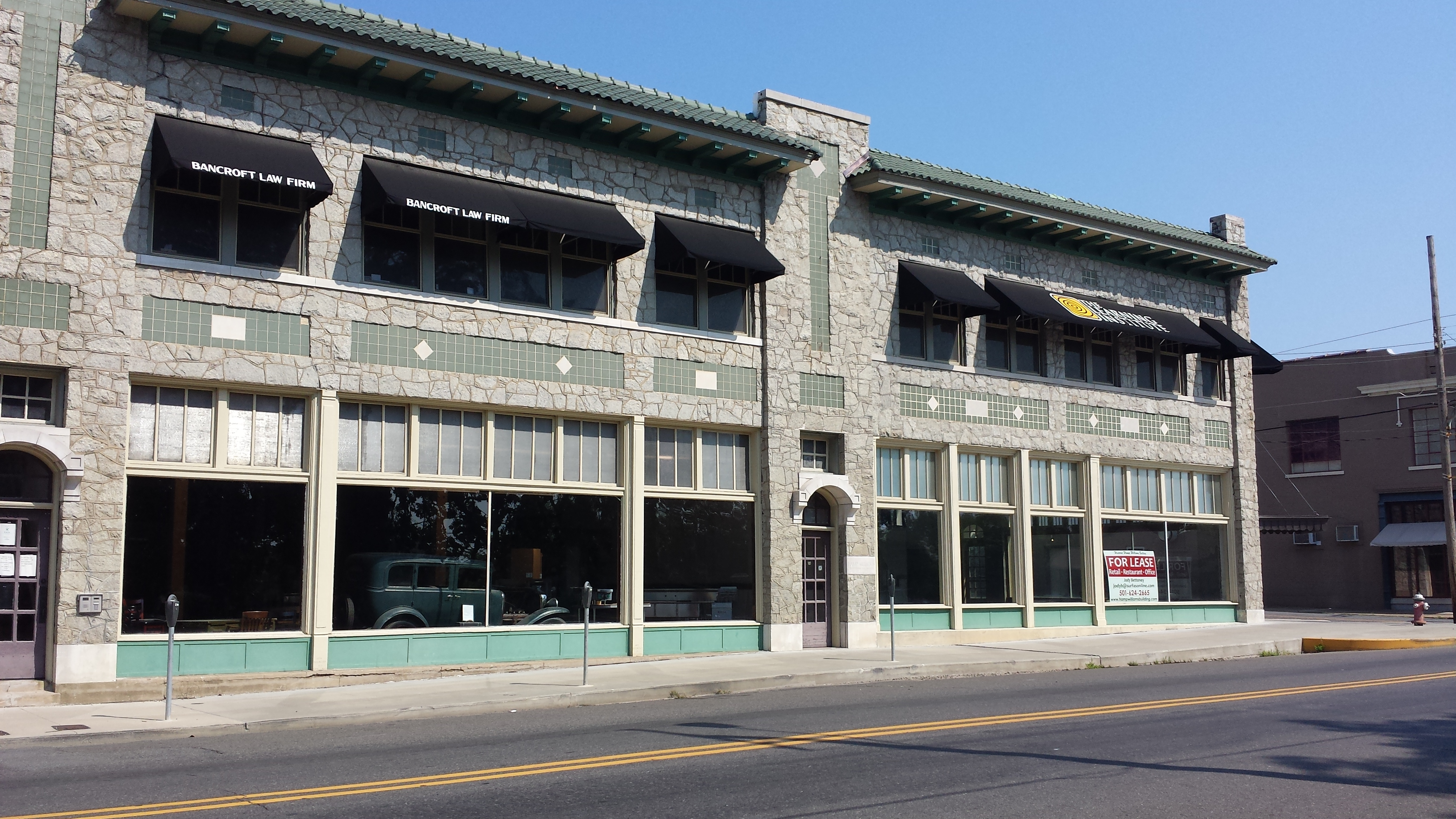

- Location within Arkansas Location within the United States
- Location: 500-504 Ouachita Ave., Hot Springs, Arkansas
- Coordinates: 34°30′26″N 93°3′32″W
- Area: 1.1 acres (0.45 ha)
- Built: 1920
- Architect: Sanders & Ginocchio
- Architectural style: Renaissance
- MPS: Arkansas Highway History and Architecture MPS
- NRHP reference No.: 07000972
- Added to NRHP: September 20, 2007

The Hamp Williams Building is a historic commercial building at 500-504 Ouachita Avenue in Hot Springs, Arkansas. It is a two-story masonry structure, built out of granite and tile, and stands across from the Garland County Courthouse. Its main facade is divided into three storefronts, and has a tile mansard roof with a deep bracketed cornice. It was built in 1920 to house the Hamp Williams Automobile Company, and was at the time of its construction one of the city's largest commercial and retail spaces.

The building was listed on the National Register of Historic Places in 2007.

== See also ==
- National Register of Historic Places listings in Garland County, Arkansas
