= Charlotte Street Historic District =

Historic district in Arkansas, United States

- U.S. National Register of Historic Places
- U.S. Historic district
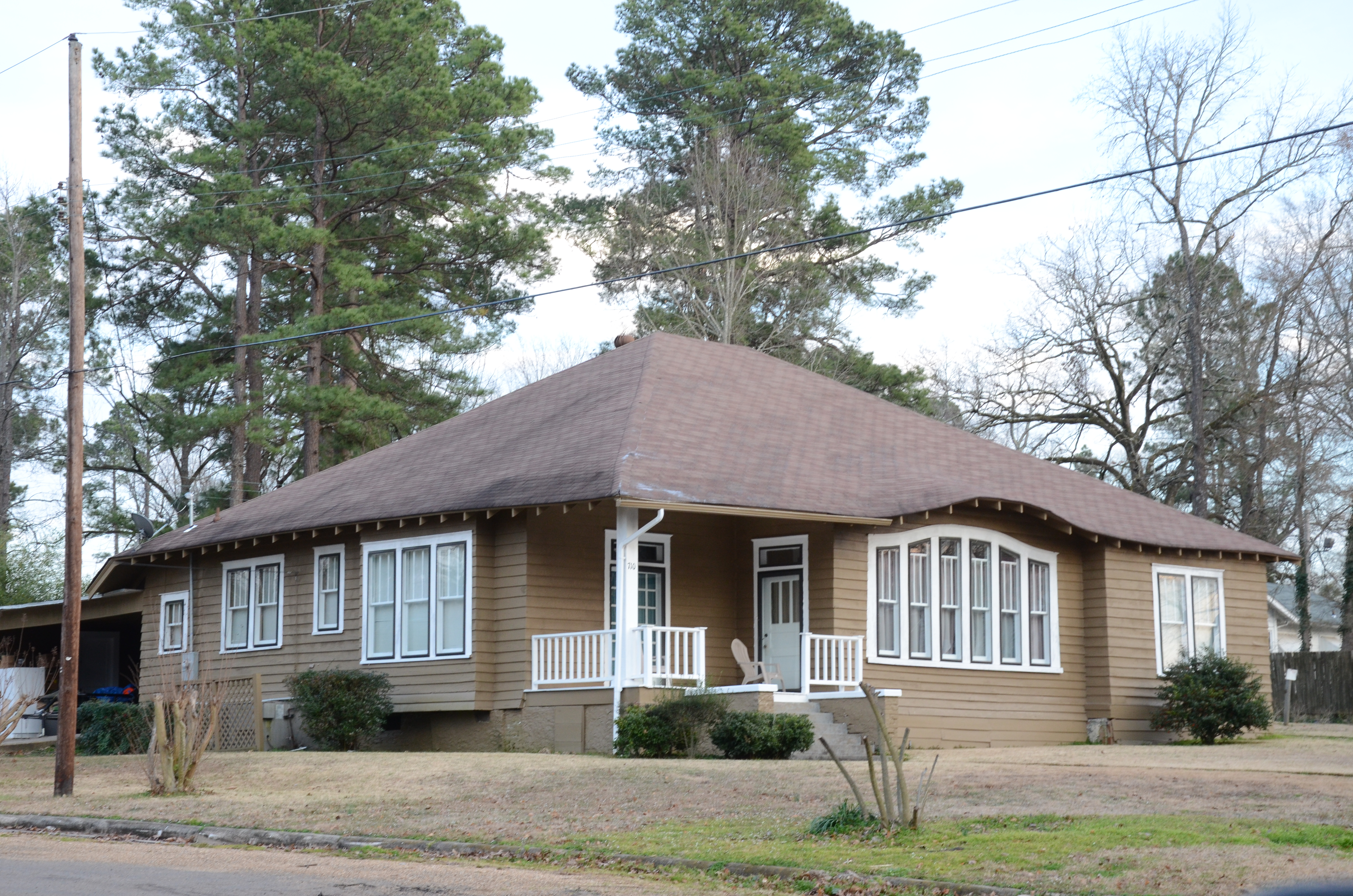

- Location within Arkansas Location within the United States
- Location: Roughly bounded by Holmes, Charlotte, Broadway, and E. College Sts., Fordyce, Arkansas
- Area: 15.5 acres (6.3 ha)
- Architect: Sanders & Ginocchio, Charles L. Thompson, others
- Architectural style: Bungalow/American craftsman
- MPS: Dallas County MRA
- NRHP reference No.: 87001348
- Added to NRHP: September 14, 1987

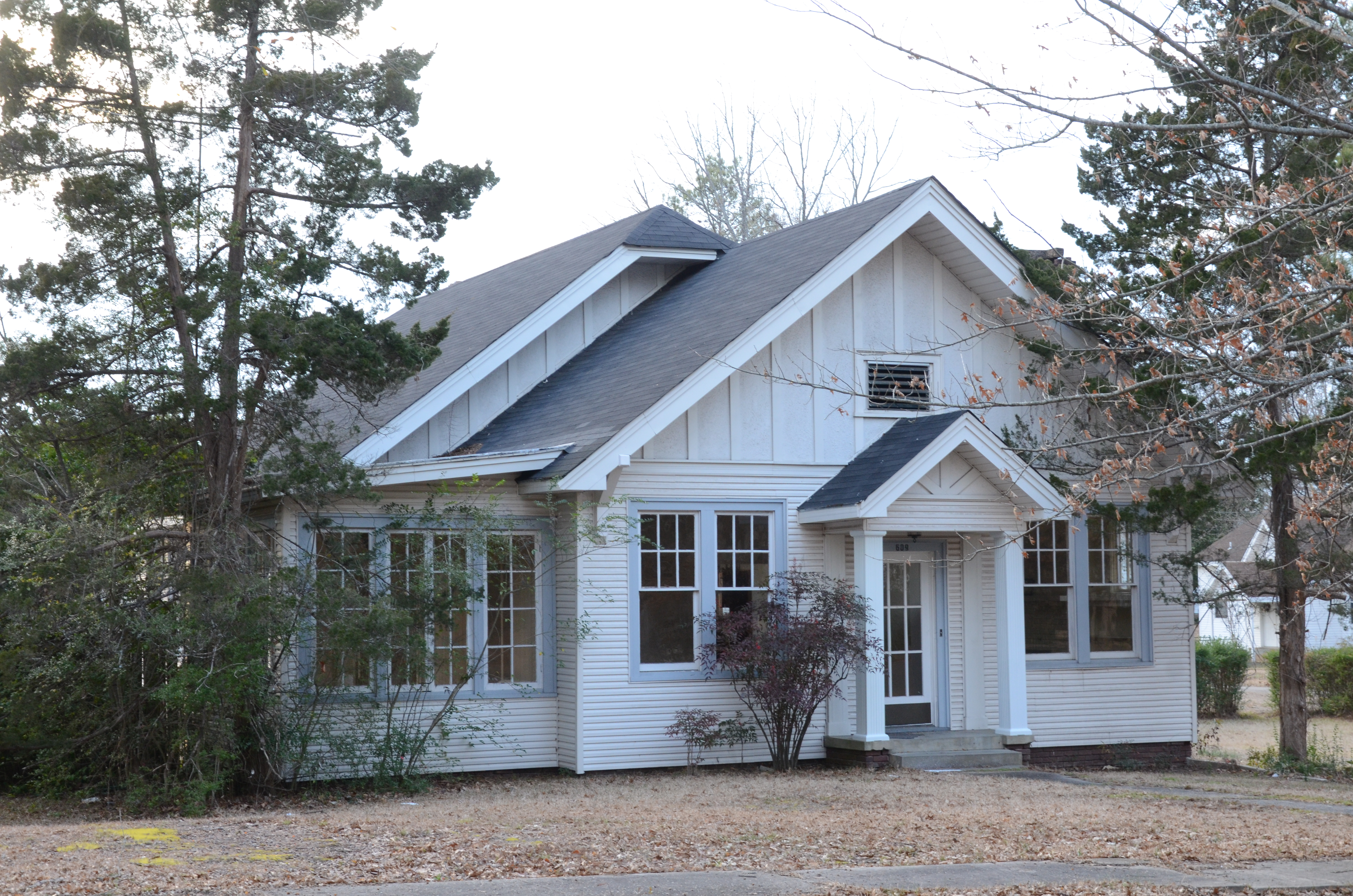
Residential house in Charlotte Street Historic District

The Charlotte Street Historic District encompasses a historic residential subdivision in Fordyce, Arkansas. The district extends along Charlotte Street between Holmes and East 4th Streets, and includes a few properties on Broadway, as well as the remaining grounds of the estate of A. B. Banks, an insurance company owner who oversaw the area's development in the 1920s. The area originally consisted of a large tract of land outside the city, which was annexed to it in 1906. Charlotte Street was named for Banks' wife, and he had a handsome estate house built on this land which was designed by Charles L. Thompson, which burned in 1964. Many features of the estate, located between Broadway and East 4th, have been retained, including an inground swimming pool that was supposedly the first private pool in the state.

Banks oversaw the gradual development of the area north of his estate, building a collection of modest Craftsman style houses lining Charlotte Street between about 1906 and 1930. Many of them were built by the same contractor, C. H. Kollman, and the neighborhood presents the most unified appearance of any in the city. At least one was designed by associates of Charles L. Thompson.

The district was listed on the National Register of Historic Places in 1987.

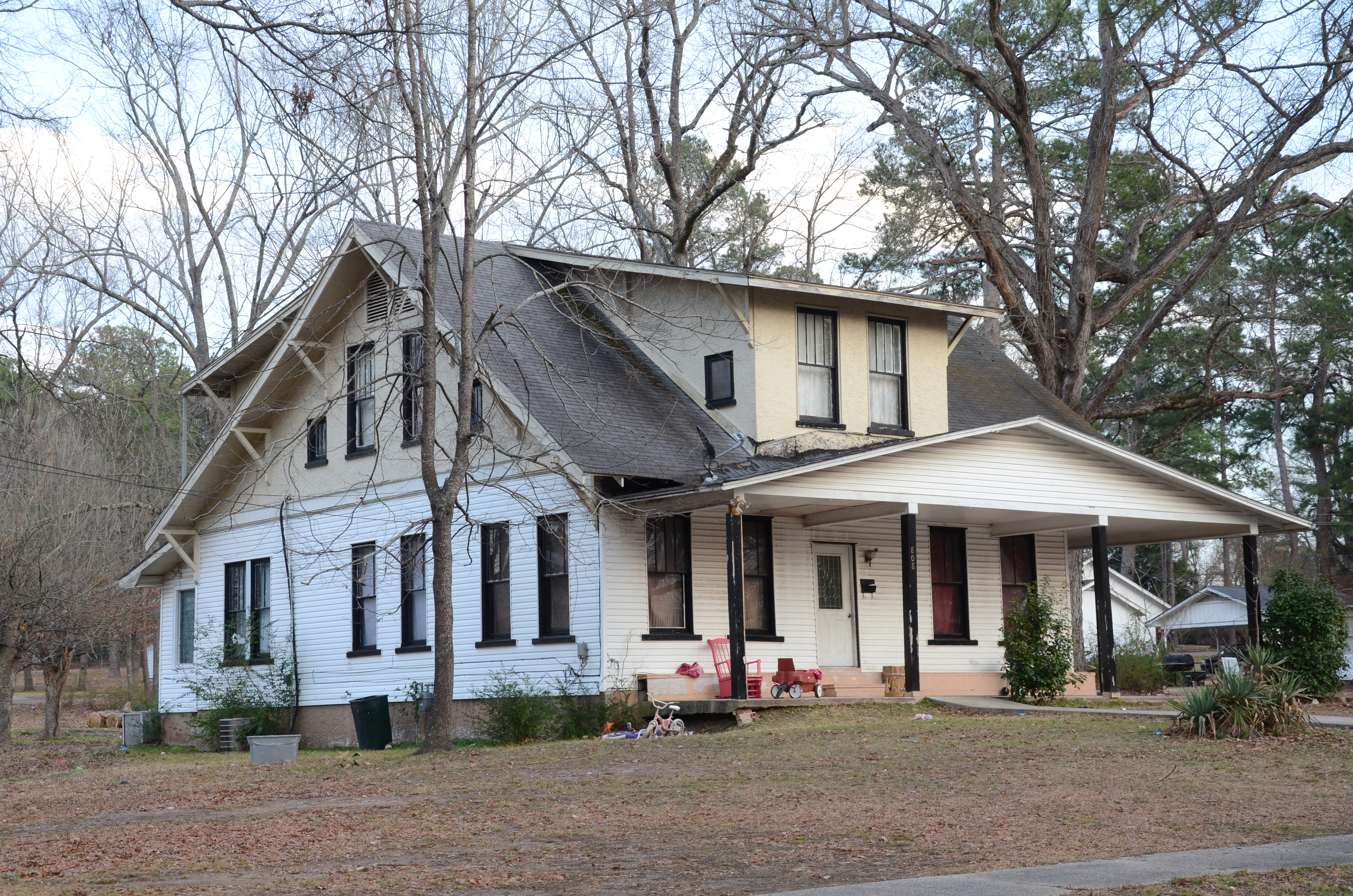

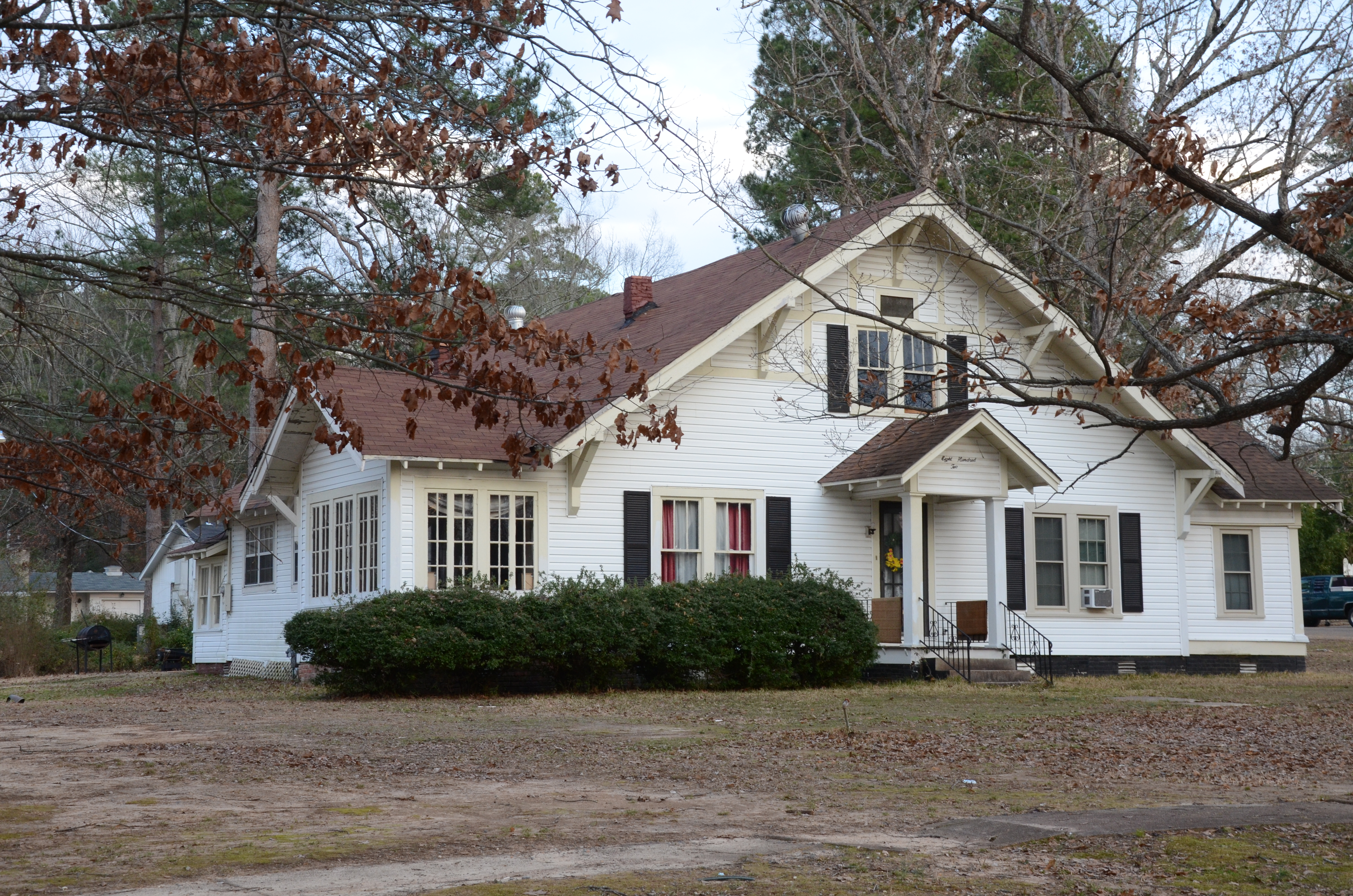

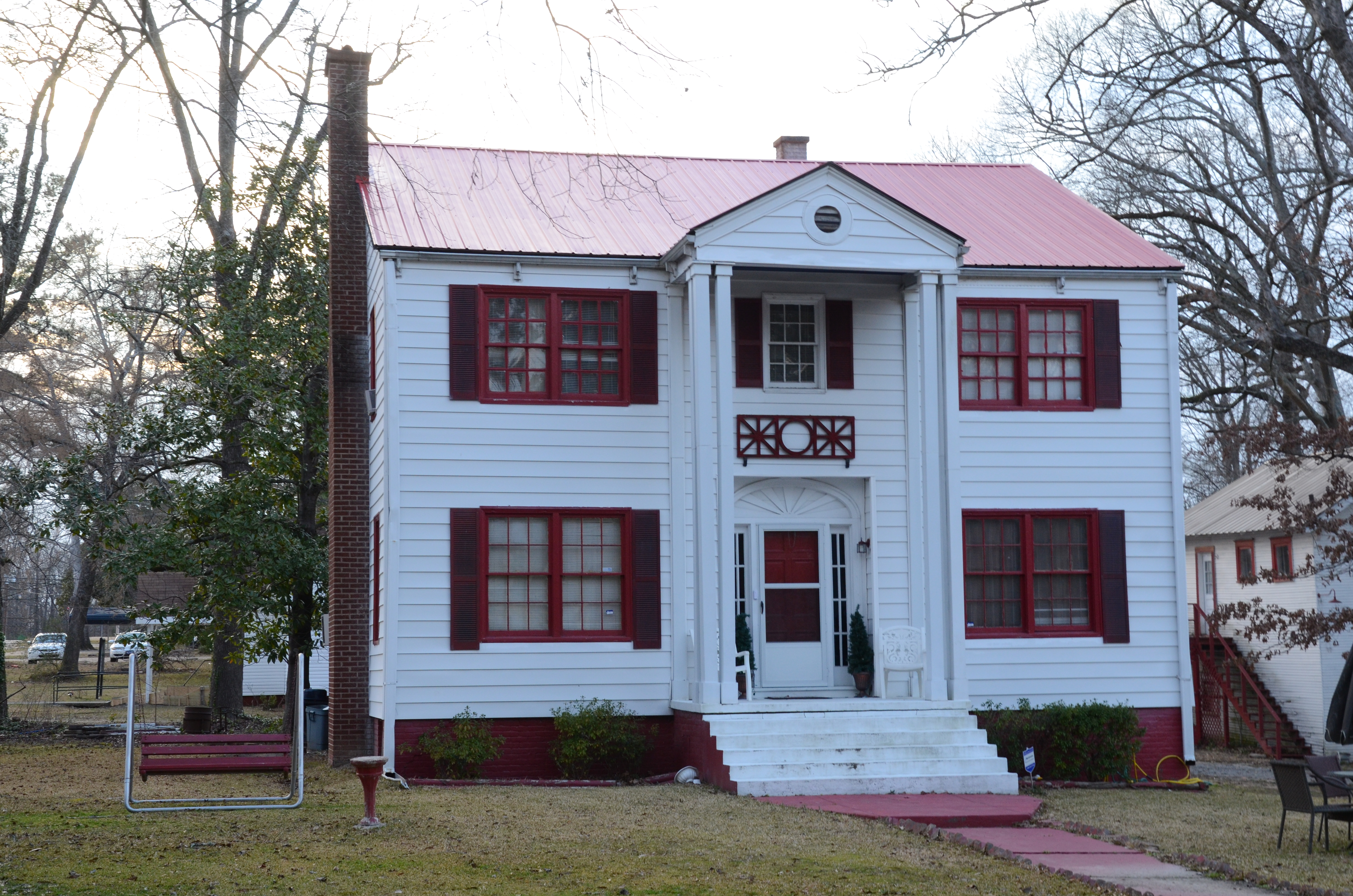

== See also ==
- National Register of Historic Places listings in Dallas County, Arkansas
