= Gregg House (Newport, Arkansas) =

Historic house in Arkansas, United States

- U.S. National Register of Historic Places
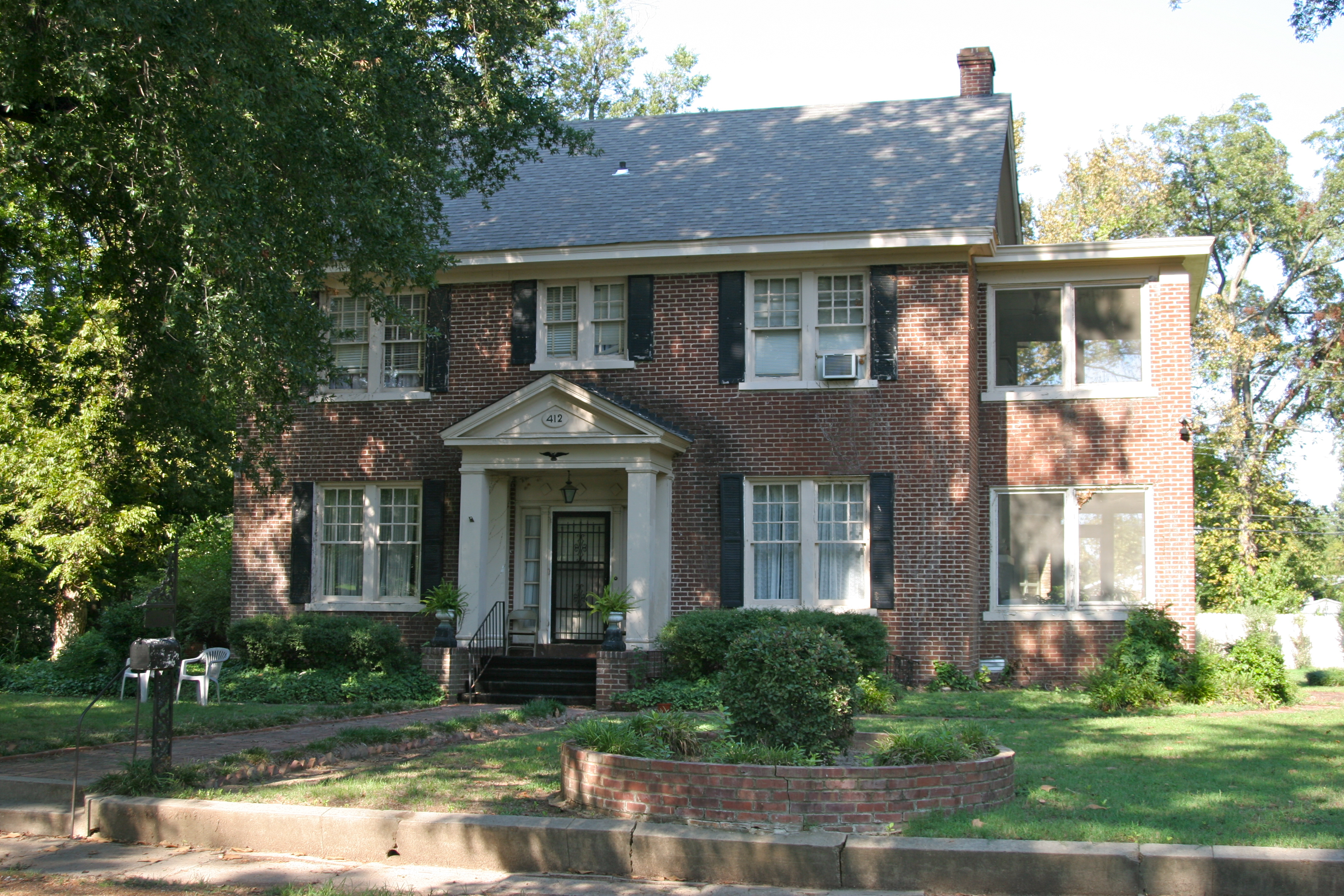

- Location within Arkansas Location within the United States
- Location: 412 Pine St., Newport, Arkansas
- Coordinates: 35°36′36″N 91°17′4″W
- Area: less than one acre
- Built: 1920
- Architect: Sanders & Ginocchio
- Architectural style: Colonial Revival
- MPS: Thompson, Charles L., Design Collection TR
- NRHP reference No.: 82000838
- Added to NRHP: December 22, 1982

The Gregg House is a historic house at 412 Pine Street in Newport, Arkansas. It is a two-story brick-faced structure, three bays wide, with a side gable roof, twin interior chimneys, and a two-story addition projecting to the right. The front facade bays are filled with paired sash windows, except for the entrance at the center, which is sheltered by a gable-roofed portico supported by box columns. The entrance is flanked by sidelight windows and topped by a lintel decorated with rosettes. The house was designed by Sanders and Ginocchio and built in 1920, and is a fine local example of Colonial Revival architecture.

The house was listed on the National Register of Historic Places in 1982.

== See also ==
- National Register of Historic Places listings in Jackson County, Arkansas
