= Snyder House (Little Rock, Arkansas) =

Historic house in Arkansas, United States

- U.S. National Register of Historic Places
- U.S. Historic district – Contributing property
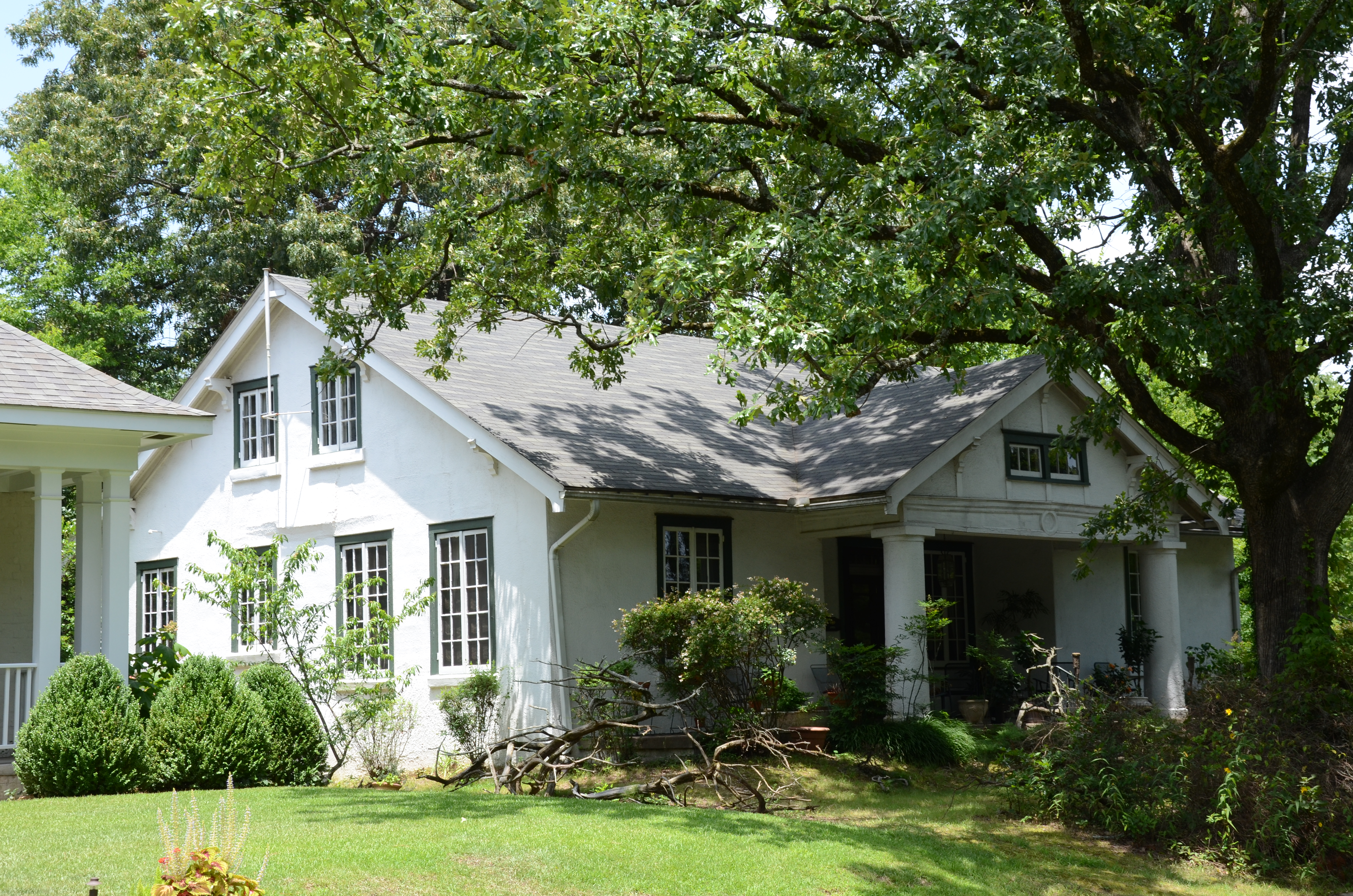

- Location within Arkansas Location within the United States
- Location: 4004 S. Lookout, Little Rock, Arkansas
- Coordinates: 34°45′49″N 92°19′5″W
- Area: less than one acre
- Built: 1925
- Architect: Sanders & Ginocchio
- Architectural style: Colonial Revival, Bungalow/American Craftsman
- Part of: Hillcrest Historic District (ID90001920)
- MPS: Thompson, Charles L., Design Collection TR
- NRHP reference No.: 82000928

Significant dates
- Added to NRHP: December 22, 1982
- Designated CP: December 18, 1990

The Snyder House is a historic house at 4004 South Lookout Street in Little Rock, Arkansas. It is a 1 1/2-story wood frame with a distinctive blend of American Craftsman and Colonial Revival elements, built in 1925 to a design by the Little Rock firm of Sanders and Ginocchio. Its gable roof is bracketed, and it features an entry portico supported by large Tuscan columns. The gable of the portico has false half-timbering.

The house was listed on the National Register of Historic Places in 1982.

== See also ==
- National Register of Historic Places listings in Little Rock, Arkansas
