= Fox House (Pine Bluff, Arkansas) =

Historic house in Arkansas, United States

- U.S. National Register of Historic Places
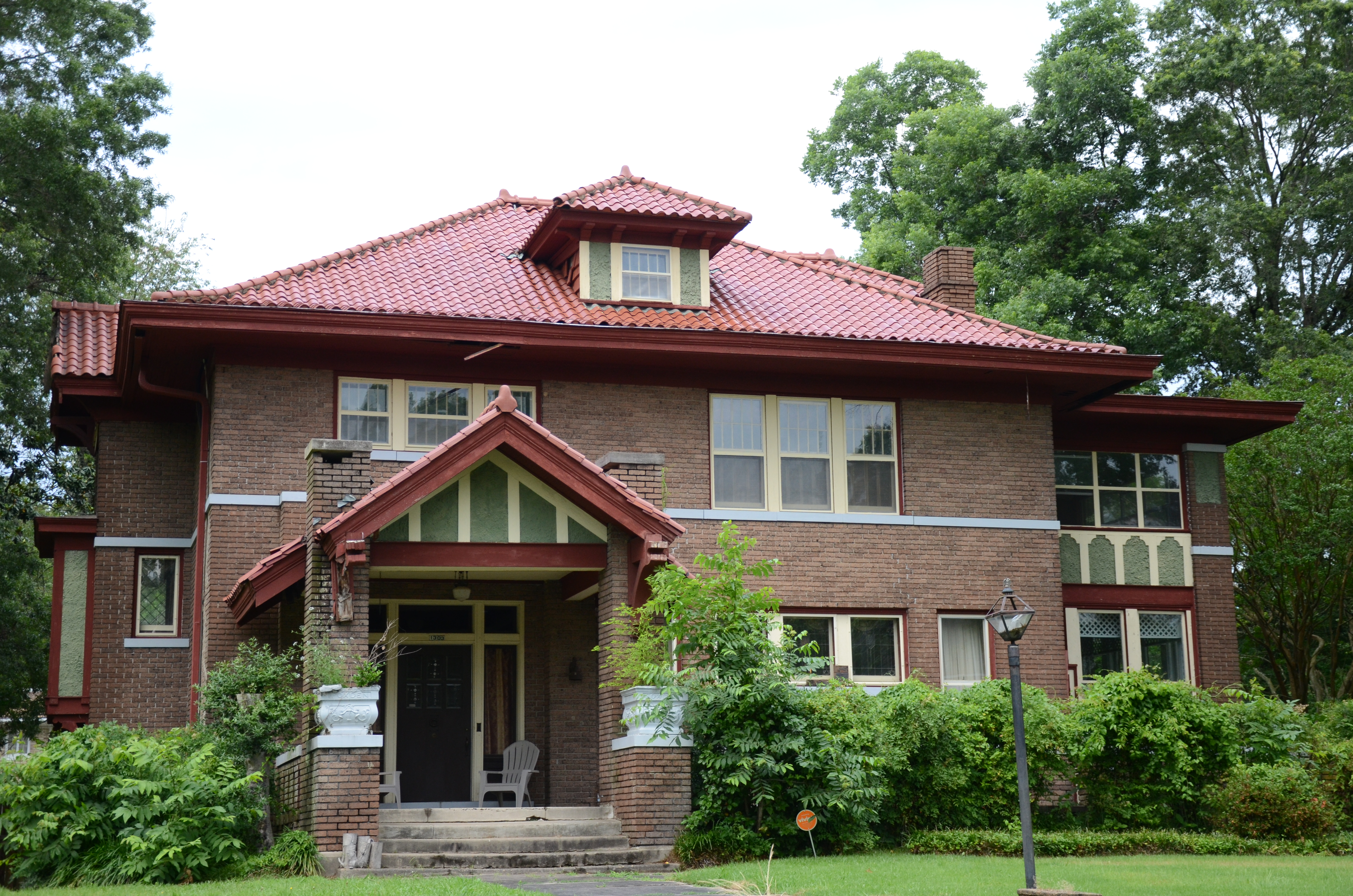

- Location within Arkansas Location within the United States
- Location: 1303 S. Olive St., Pine Bluff, Arkansas
- Coordinates: 34°12′58″N 92°0′25″W
- Area: less than one acre
- Built: 1910
- Architect: Theodore Sanders
- Architectural style: Bungalow/American Craftsman
- MPS: Thompson, Charles L., Design Collection TR
- NRHP reference No.: 82000845
- Added to NRHP: December 22, 1982

The Fox House is a historic house at 1303 South Olive Street in Pine Bluff, Arkansas. It is a two-story frame structure, its exterior finished in a variety of materials, with a tiled hip roof. The walls have a typical Craftsman-style variety of materials, including brick, stone, and stuccoed half-timbering. A gable-roofed entrance portico projects from the front, supported by brick piers and featuring extended eaves and large brackets. The house was designed by Theodore Sanders and built c. 1910.

The house was listed on the National Register of Historic Places in 1982.

== See also ==
- National Register of Historic Places listings in Jefferson County, Arkansas
