= Hotel Freiderica =

- U.S. National Register of Historic Places
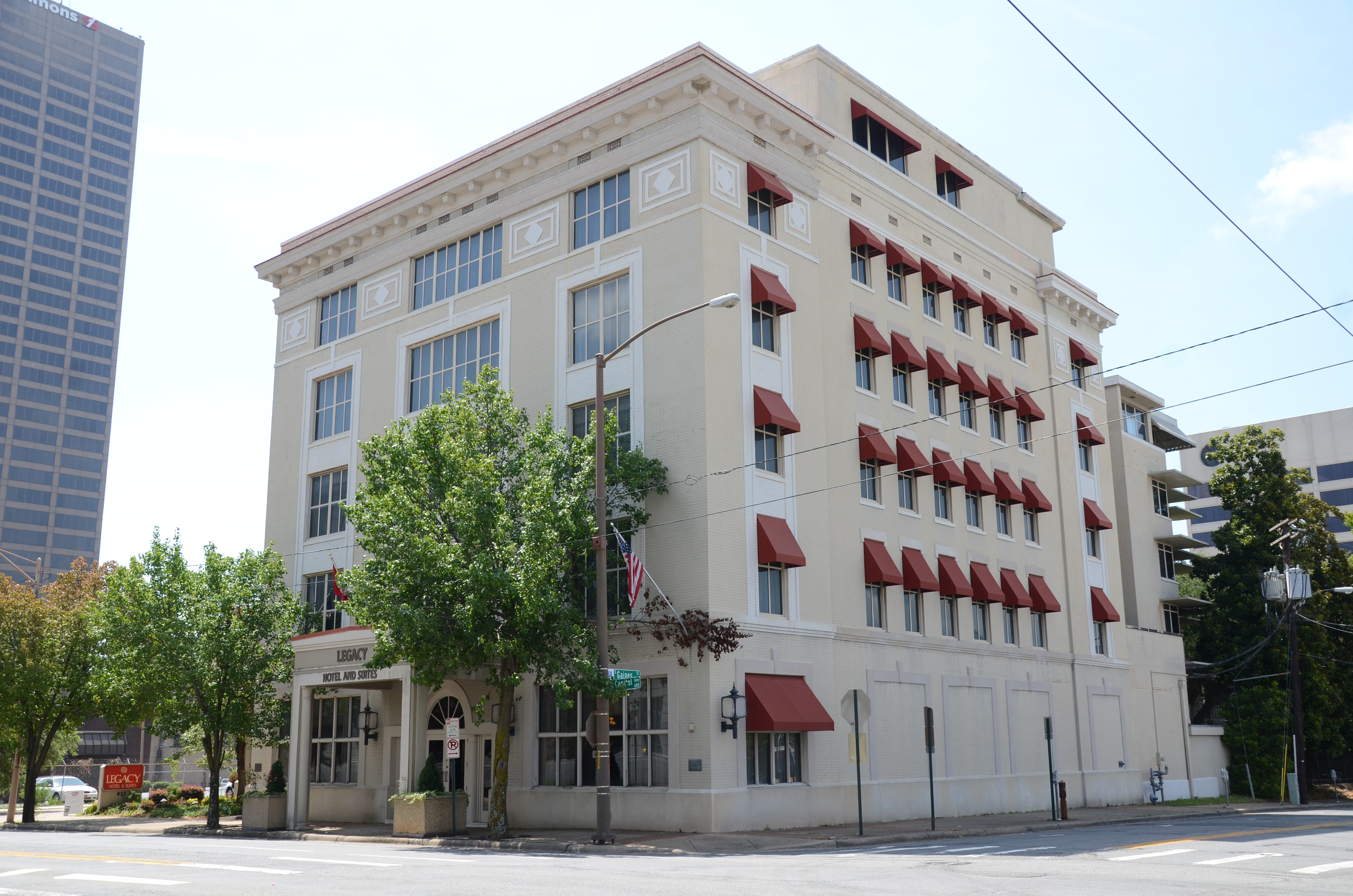

- Location within Arkansas Location within the United States
- Location: 625 W. Capitol Ave., Little Rock, Arkansas
- Coordinates: 34°44′41″N 92°16′40″W
- Area: less than one acre
- Built: 1914
- Architect: Theodore M. Sanders (1914); Edward Durell Stone (1941)
- Architectural style: Early Commercial, International Style
- NRHP reference No.: 03000951
- Added to NRHP: September 27, 2003

The Hotel Fredeirica is a historic commercial building at 625 West Capitol Avenue in Little Rock, Arkansas. The five-story building was built in 1914 and enlarged in 1941. The original building was designed by Theodore M. Sanders, and the addition by Edward Durell Stone, both prominent Arkansas architects. Both sections of the building are excellent representatives of their architectural styles: the older in a typical early 20th-century commercial style, and the addition in the International style.

Originally built by Arkansas Gazette newspaperman Fred W. Allsopp, the hotel was sold to Sam Peck in 1935.

The building was listed on the National Register of Historic Places in 2003.

== See also ==
- National Register of Historic Places listings in Little Rock, Arkansas
