= Ada Thompson Memorial Home =

- U.S. National Register of Historic Places
- U.S. Historic district – Contributing property
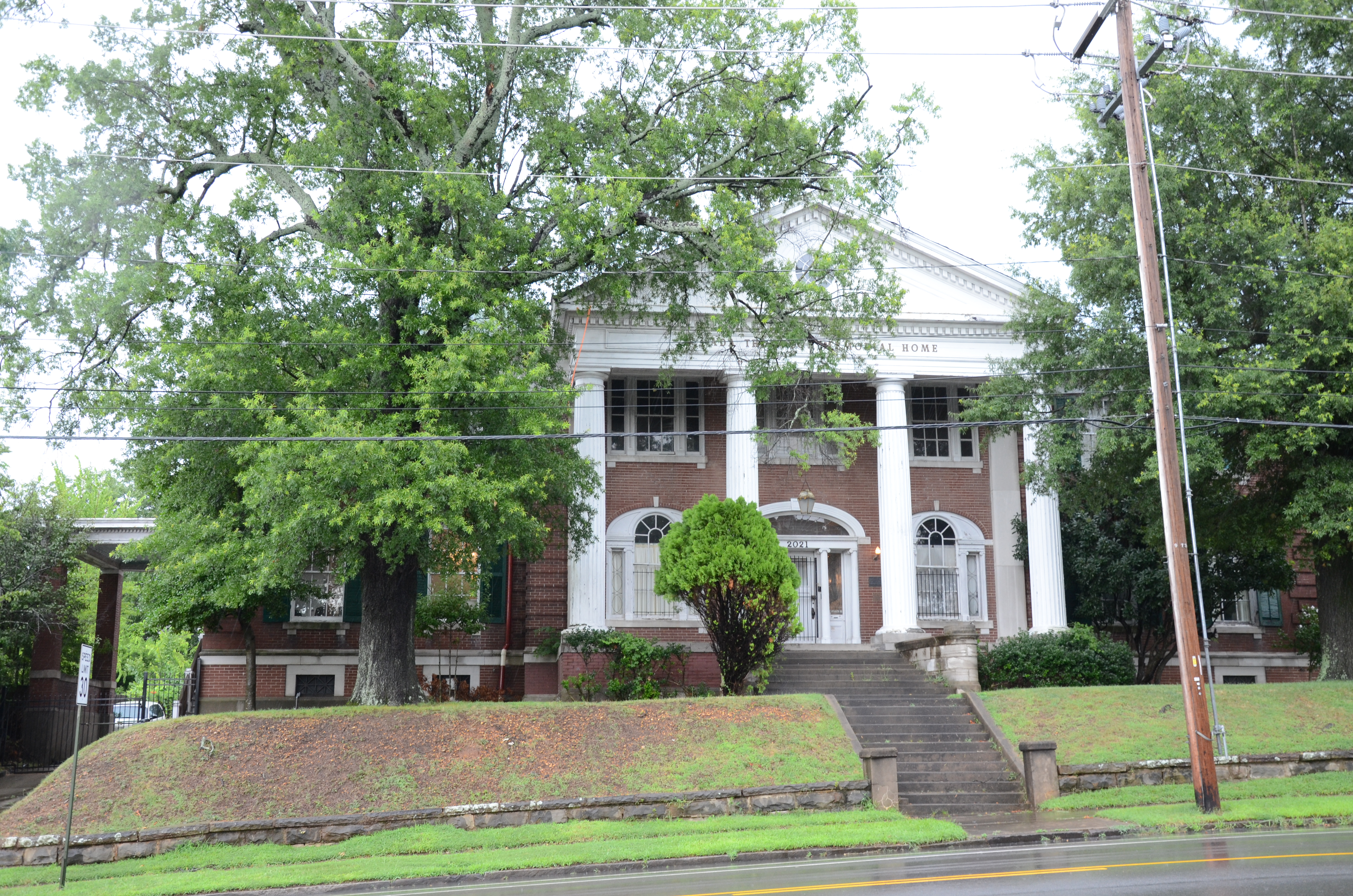

- Location within Arkansas Location within the United States
- Location: 2021 S. Main, Little Rock, Arkansas
- Coordinates: 34°43′44″N 92°16′24″W
- Area: Less than one acre
- Built: 1909
- Architect: Frank Gibb, Theodore Sanders
- Architectural style: Colonial Revival, Georgian Revival
- Part of: South Main Street Residential Historic District (ID07000436)
- NRHP reference No.: 77000272

Significant dates
- Added to NRHP: August 3, 1977
- Designated CP: July 12, 2007

The Ada Thompson Memorial Home was a home for indigent elderly women at 2021 South Main Street in Little Rock, Arkansas. Founded in 1882 by prominent local citizens, it served in that capacity until 1976. The surviving building, a two-story brick building with Beaux Arts, Colonial Revival, and Georgian Revival features, was built in 1900 to a design by Frank Gibb and Theodore Sanders. The home was named in honor of Ada Thompson Crutchfield, who gave a major bequest to the organization in honor of her parents.

The building was listed on the National Register of Historic Places in 1977.

== See also ==
- National Register of Historic Places listings in Little Rock, Arkansas
