= Healey and Roth Mortuary Building =

- U.S. National Register of Historic Places
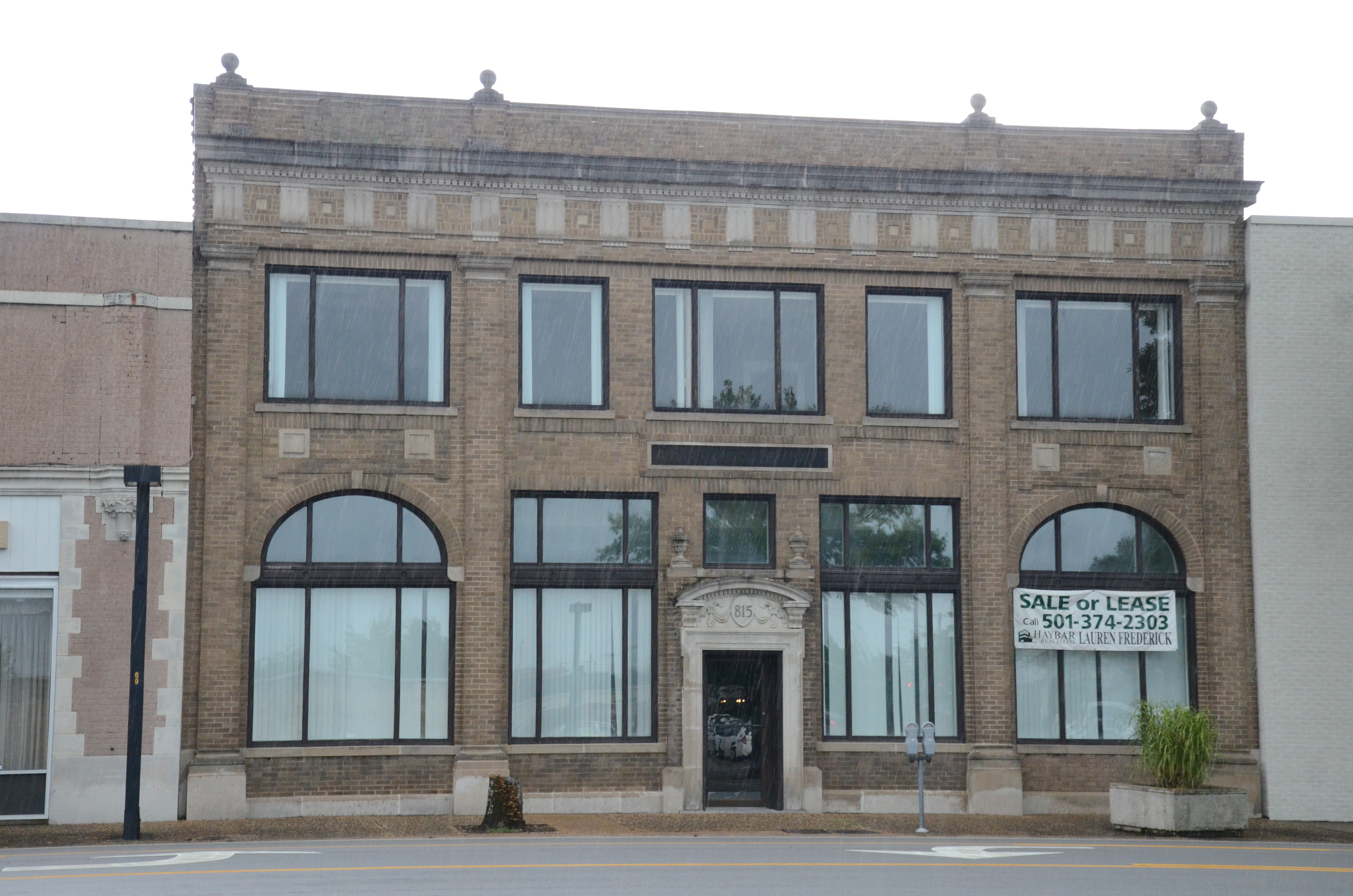

- Location within Arkansas Location within the United States
- Location: 815 Main, Little Rock, Arkansas
- Coordinates: 34°44′26″N 92°16′17″W
- Area: less than one acre
- Built: 1925
- Architect: Sanders & Ginocchio
- Architectural style: Late 19th And 20th Century Revivals, 2nd Renaissance Revival
- MPS: Thompson, Charles L., Design Collection TR
- NRHP reference No.: 82000899
- Added to NRHP: December 22, 1982

The Healey and Roth Mortuary Building is a historic commercial building located at 815 Main Street in Little Rock, Arkansas. It is a two-story brick structure, with a combination of Classical and Renaissance Revival features, designed by Sanders & Ginocchio and built in 1925. Its five-bay facade is divided into three sections by pilasters, the central three-bay section including the main entrance. The entrance is set in a stone surround, with pilasters rising to a segmented-arch pediment.

The third and final Main Street location of Healey and Roth Funeral Home, the building housed the funeral home until 1964 and was listed on the National Register of Historic Places in 1982. The exterior of the building appeared as the front of the newspaper office setting in the second season of the CBS sitcom Hearts Afire.

== See also ==
- National Register of Historic Places listings in Little Rock, Arkansas
