= Temple House (Pine Bluff, Arkansas) =

Historic house in Arkansas, United States

- U.S. National Register of Historic Places
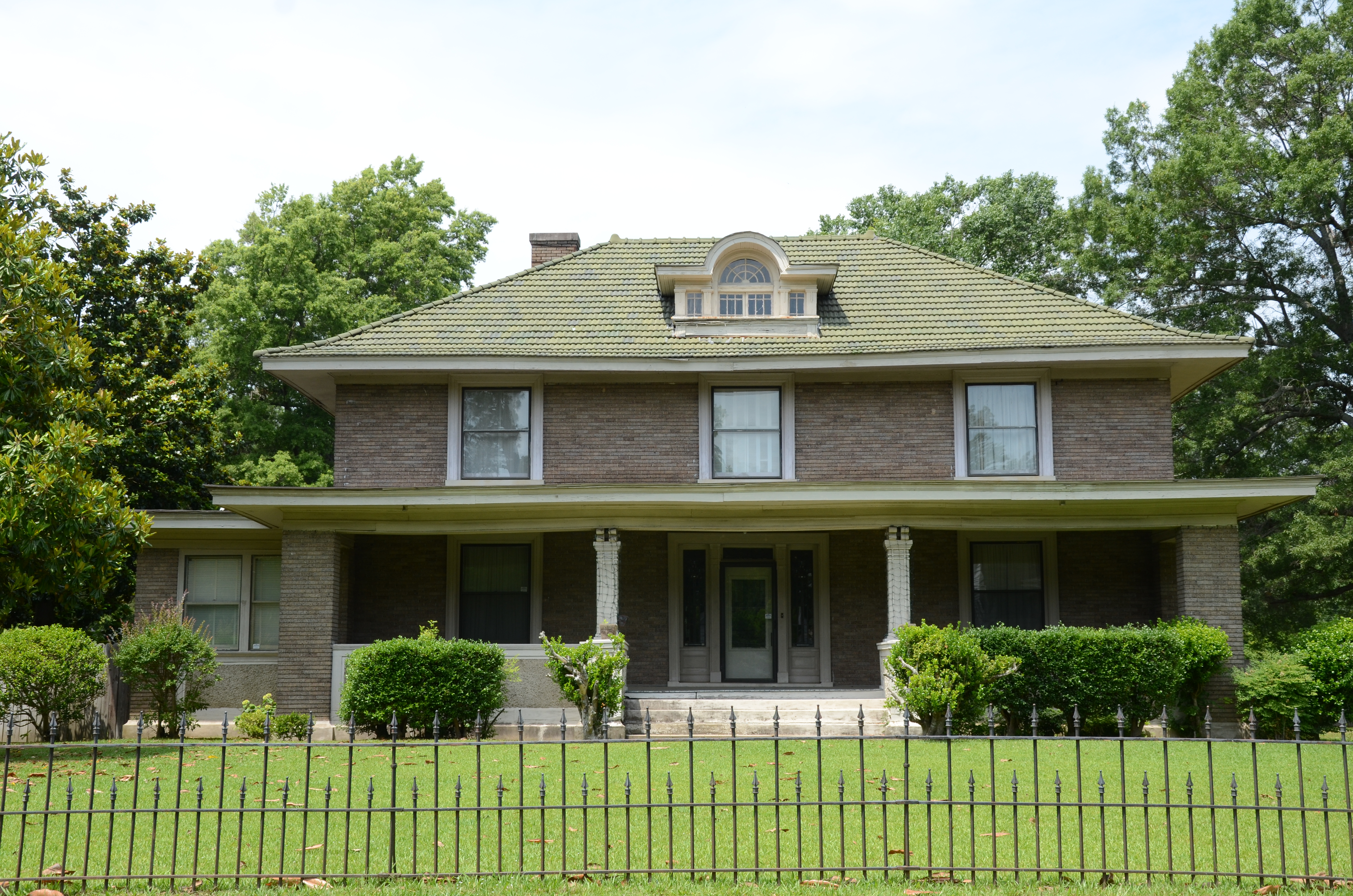

- Location within Arkansas Location within the United States
- Location: 1702 S. Oak St., Pine Bluff, Arkansas
- Coordinates: 34°12′41″N 92°0′38″W
- Area: less than one acre
- Built: 1910
- Architect: Theo Sanders
- Architectural style: Prairie School
- MPS: Thompson, Charles L., Design Collection TR
- NRHP reference No.: 82000840
- Added to NRHP: December 22, 1982

The Temple House is a historic house at 1702 South Oak Street in Pine Bluff, Arkansas. It is a two-story brown brick structure, with a low-pitch hip roof and broad eaves typical of the Prairie School of architecture. A single-story flat-roof porch extends across the front, continuing to a form a porte-cochere to the left, with brick piers and low brick wall with stone coping. The house was built c. 1910 to a design by the architectural firm of Theo Sanders.

The house was listed on the National Register of Historic Places in 1982.

== See also ==
- National Register of Historic Places listings in Jefferson County, Arkansas
