= Safferstone House =

Historic house in Arkansas, United States

- U.S. National Register of Historic Places
- U.S. Historic district – Contributing property
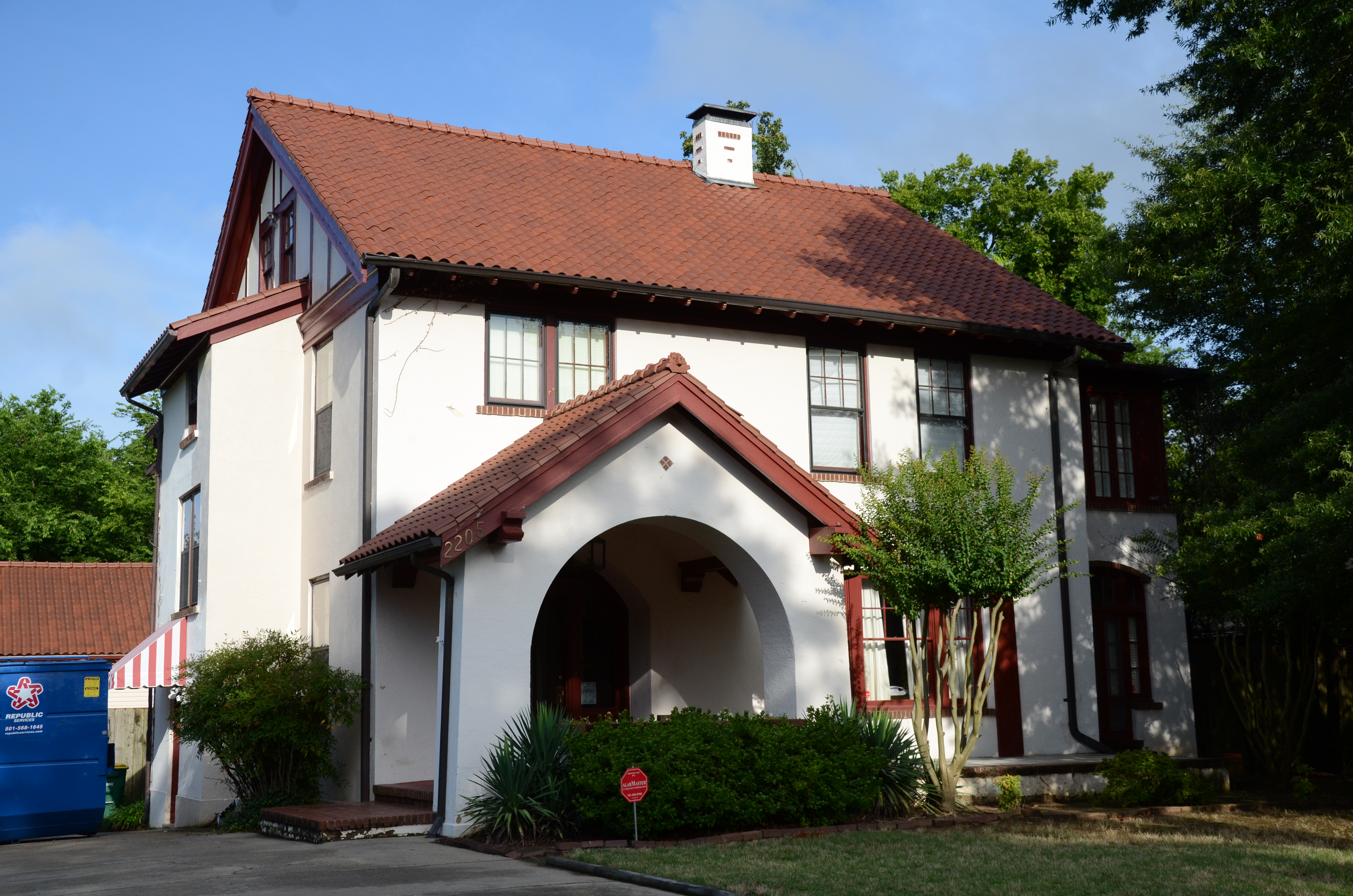

- Location within Arkansas Location within the United States
- Location: 2205 Arch St., Little Rock, Arkansas
- Coordinates: 34°43′38″N 92°16′46″W
- Area: less than one acre
- Built: 1920
- Architect: Sanders & Ginocchio
- Architectural style: Mission/Spanish Revival
- Part of: Governor's Mansion Historic District (ID78000620)
- MPS: Thompson, Charles L., Design Collection TR
- NRHP reference No.: 82000925

Significant dates
- Added to NRHP: December 22, 1982
- Designated CP: September 13, 1978

The Safferstone House is a historic house at 2205 Arch Street in Little Rock, Arkansas. It is a two-story stuccoed building, with a gabled terra cotta roof. A single-story gabled porch extends to the front across the left half, with a rounded archway in the front. A recessed ell extends to the right of the main block, and a shed-roof bay projects to the left. The house was built in 1925 and designed by Sanders and Ginocchio (Cromwell), and is an example of Spanish Mission Revival architecture.

The house was listed on the National Register of Historic Places in 1982.

== See also ==
- National Register of Historic Places listings in Little Rock, Arkansas
