= Luxor Apartments =

- U.S. National Register of Historic Places
- U.S. Historic district – Contributing property
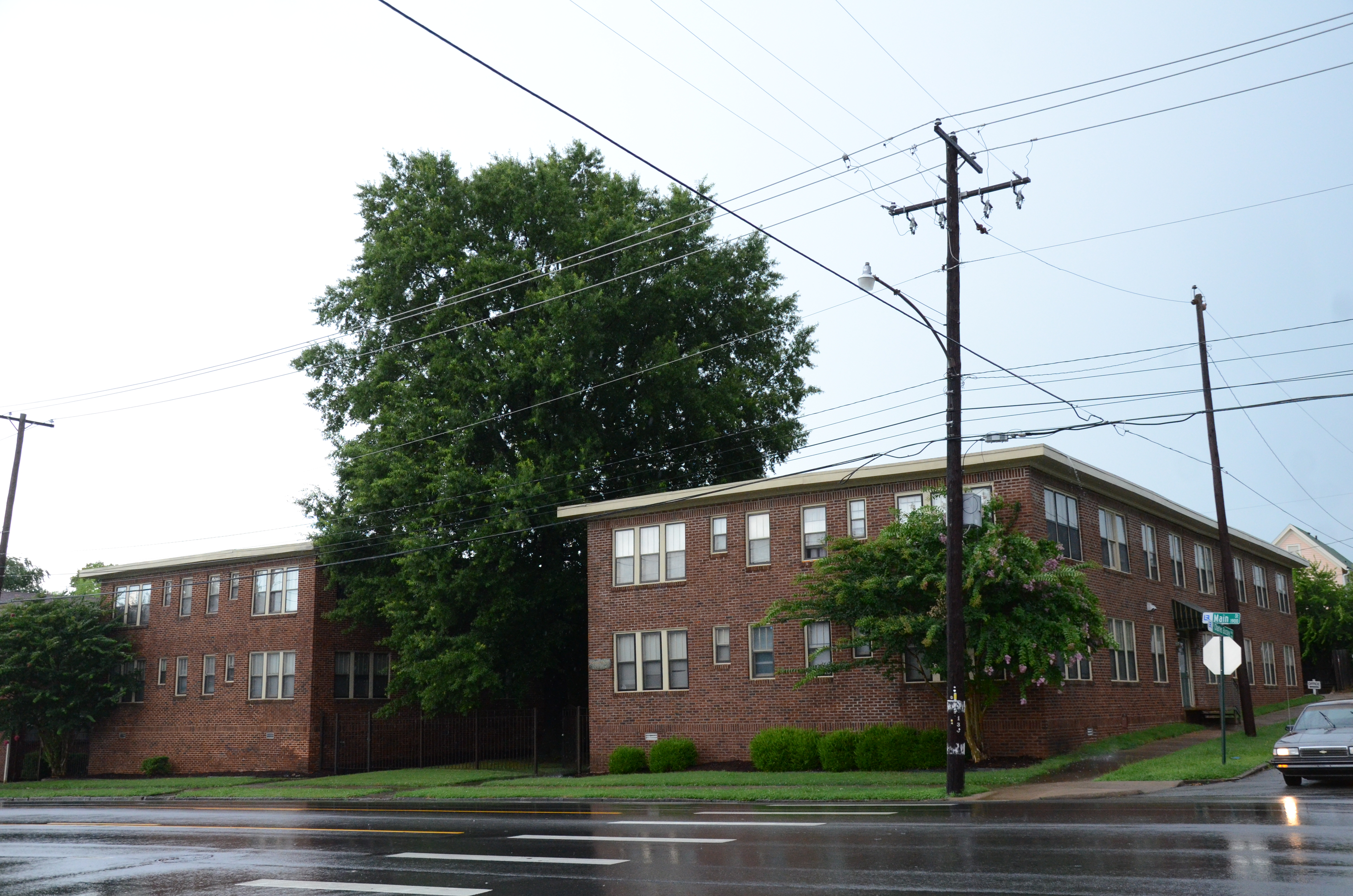
- Luxor Apartments in 2015

- Location within Arkansas Location within the United States
- Location: 1923 Main St., Little Rock, Arkansas
- Coordinates: 34°43′47″N 92°16′24″W
- Area: less than one acre
- Built: 1924
- Architectural style: Bungalow/craftsman
- Part of: South Main Street Residential Historic District (ID07000436)
- MPS: Little Rock Apartment Buildings MPS
- NRHP reference No.: 95000375

Significant dates
- Added to NRHP: April 7, 1995
- Designated CP: July 12, 2007

The Luxor Apartments are a historic apartment building at 1923 Main Street in Little Rock, Arkansas. It is a U-shaped two-story brick building, with sparse Craftsman styling that includes brackets on the shed roof over its main entrance. It houses 28 small units, most of which retain original features such as Murphy beds, built-in china cabinets, and flooring. When built in 1924, it was the largest apartment building in the city by square footage, and represented a rapid urbanization trend of the period.

The building was listed on the National Register of Historic Places in 1995.

== See also ==
- National Register of Historic Places listings in Little Rock, Arkansas
