= Robert E. Lee School (Little Rock, Arkansas) =

- U.S. National Register of Historic Places
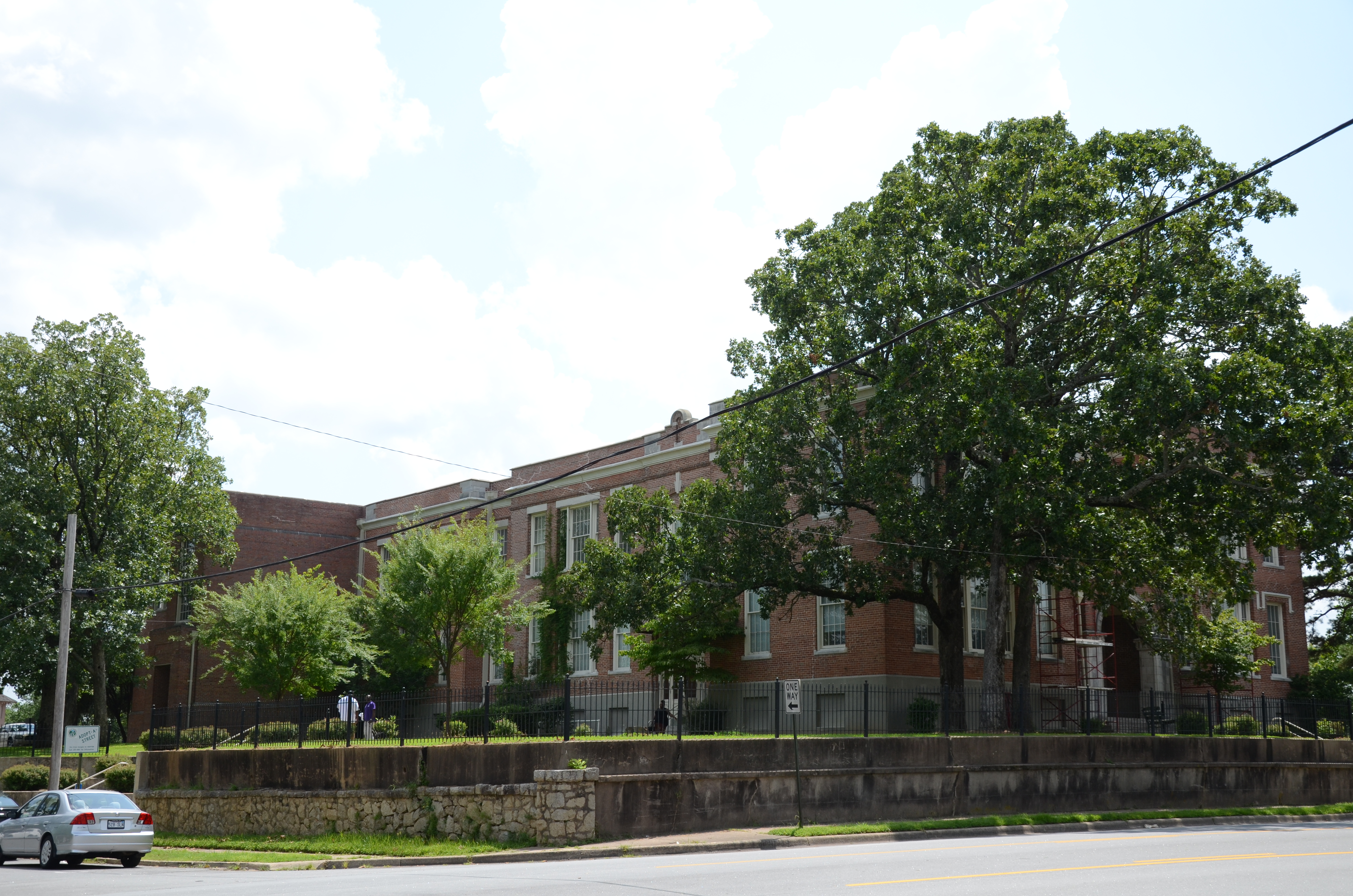

- Location within Arkansas Location within the United States
- Location: 3805 W. 12th St., Little Rock, Arkansas
- Coordinates: 34°44′31″N 92°18′58″W
- Area: 1.5 acres (0.61 ha)
- Built: 1906
- Built by: Theo Sanders (Gibb & Sanders); et al.
- Architectural style: Collegiate Gothic architecture
- NRHP reference No.: 09000370
- Added to NRHP: June 2, 2009

The Robert E. Lee School is a historic former school building at 3805 West 12th Street in Little Rock, Arkansas. Now a local community and social service center, this collegiate Gothic two-story masonry building was built in 1906-07 and twice enlarged. The original design was by Gibb & Sanders, and the additions were by Theo Sanders (1910) and Thomas Harding, Jr. (1930). The city used the building as a school until 1971. In the 1990s it was used as a teacher training facility, and was in 2005 repurposed as a community center.

The building was listed on the National Register of Historic Places in 2009.

== See also ==
- National Register of Historic Places listings in Little Rock, Arkansas
