= Beal-Burrow Dry Goods Building =

- U.S. National Register of Historic Places
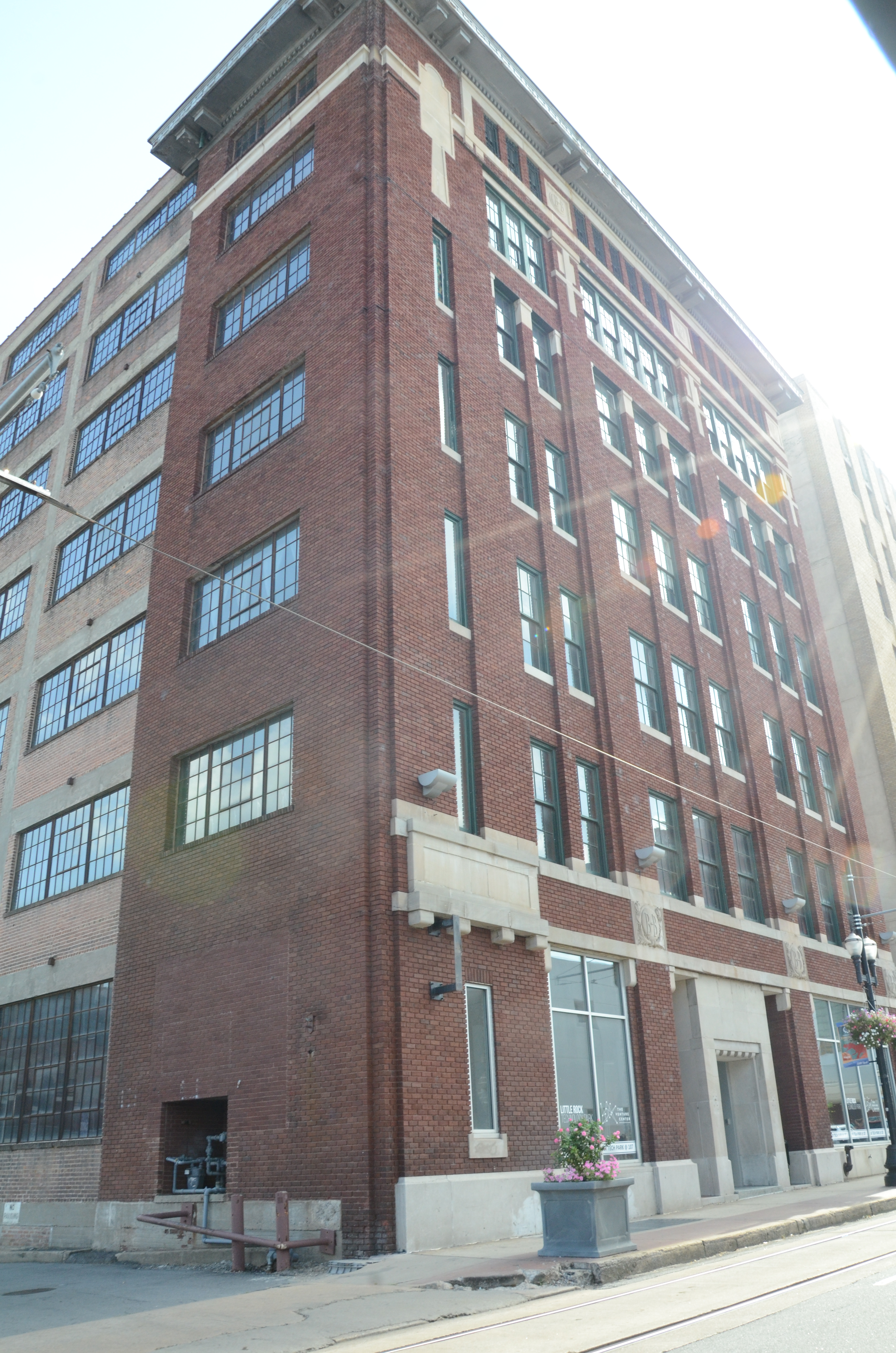

- Location within Arkansas Location within the United States
- Location: 107 E. Markham, Little Rock, Arkansas
- Coordinates: 34°44′52″N 92°16′10″W
- Area: less than one acre
- Built: 1920
- Architect: Charles L. Thompson
- Architectural style: Prairie School
- MPS: Thompson, Charles L., Design Collection TR
- NRHP reference No.: 87001546
- Added to NRHP: June 26, 1995

The Beal-Burrow Dry Goods Building is a historic commercial building at 107 East Markham Street in Little Rock, Arkansas. It is a seven-story concrete frame structure, finished in brick. Its main entrance is recessed at the center of its main facade, richly decorated in stone. The roof cornice is pressed metal, and paneled medallions punctuate the banding between the first and second floors. The building was probably designed by Arkansas architect Charles L. Thompson, for the Beal-Burrow Company, a wholesaler of dry goods.

The building was listed on the National Register of Historic Places in 1995. The building is currently being used as an apartment community called Block 2 Lofts.

== See also ==
- National Register of Historic Places listings in Little Rock, Arkansas
