= Sanders House (Little Rock, Arkansas) =

Historic house in Arkansas, United States

- U.S. National Register of Historic Places
- U.S. Historic district – Contributing property
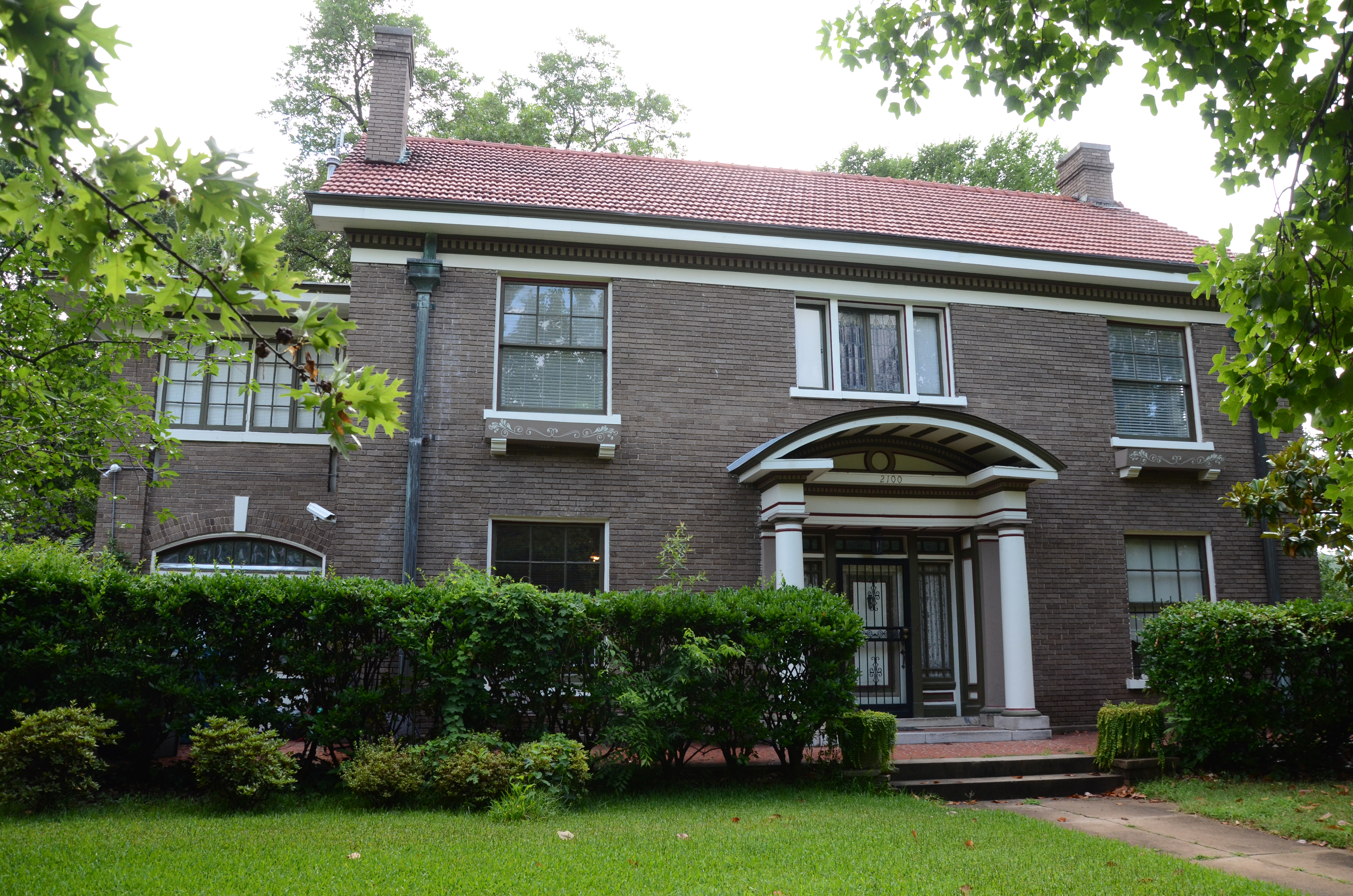

- Location within Arkansas Location within the United States
- Location: 2100 Gaines St., Little Rock, Arkansas
- Coordinates: 34°43′42″N 92°16′52″W
- Built: 1917
- Architect: Theo Sanders
- Architectural style: Colonial Revival
- Part of: Governor's Mansion Historic District (ID78000620)
- MPS: Thompson, Charles L., Design Collection TR
- NRHP reference No.: 82000924

Significant dates
- Added to NRHP: December 22, 1982
- Designated CP: September 13, 1978

The Sanders House is a historic house at 2100 Gaines Street in Little Rock, Arkansas. It is a two-story brick structure, topped by a gabled tile roof. Its facade is three bays wide, with a center entrance sheltered by a rounded porch supported by Tuscan columns. Windows in the side bays are sash, while that above the entrance is a band of four casement windows with Prairie School style. The house was built in 1917 to a design by local architect Theo Sanders.

The house was listed on the National Register of Historic Places in 1982.
