= BPOE Elks Club (Little Rock, Arkansas) =

- U.S. National Register of Historic Places
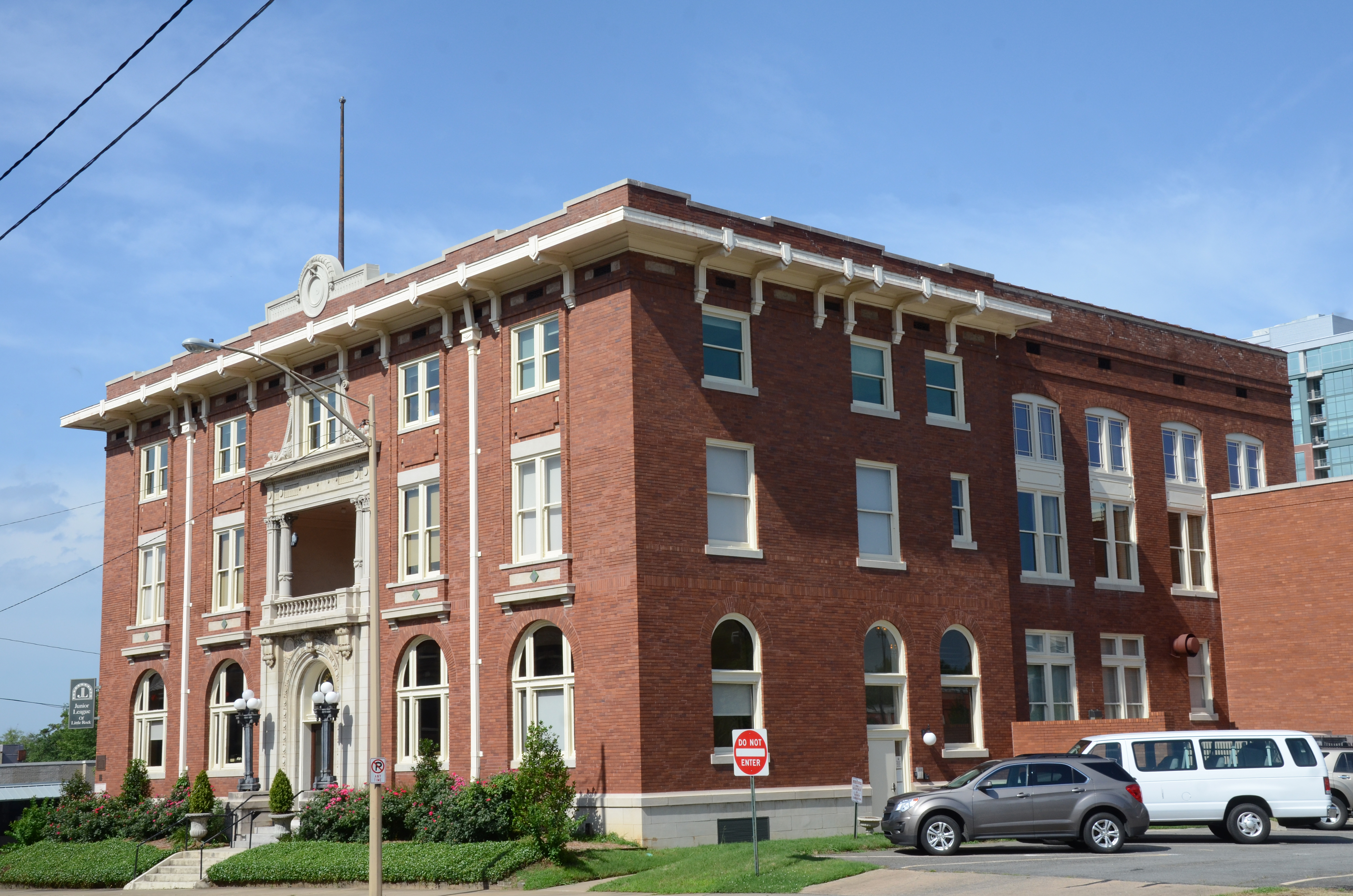

- Location within Arkansas Location within the United States
- Location: 4th and Scott Sts., Little Rock, Arkansas
- Coordinates: 34°44′44″N 92°16′9″W
- Area: less than one acre
- Built: 1908
- Architect: Theo Saunders
- Architectural style: Late 19th And 20th Century Revivals, 2nd Renaissance Revival
- MPS: Thompson, Charles L., Design Collection TR
- NRHP reference No.: 82000880
- Added to NRHP: December 22, 1982

The BPOE Elks Club is a historic social club meeting house at 4th and Scott Streets in Little Rock, Arkansas. It is a handsome three-story brick building, with Renaissance Revival features. It was built in 1908 to a design by Theo Saunders. Its flat roof has an extended cornice supported by slender brackets, and its main entrance is set in an elaborate round-arch opening with a recessed porch on the second level above. Ground-floor windows are set in rounded arches, and are multi-section, while second-floor windows are rectangular, set above decorative aprons supported by brackets.

The building was listed on the National Register of Historic Places in 1982.

== See also ==
- National Register of Historic Places listings in Little Rock, Arkansas
