= South Main Street Residential Historic District (Little Rock, Arkansas) =

Historic district in Arkansas, United States

- U.S. National Register of Historic Places
- U.S. Historic district
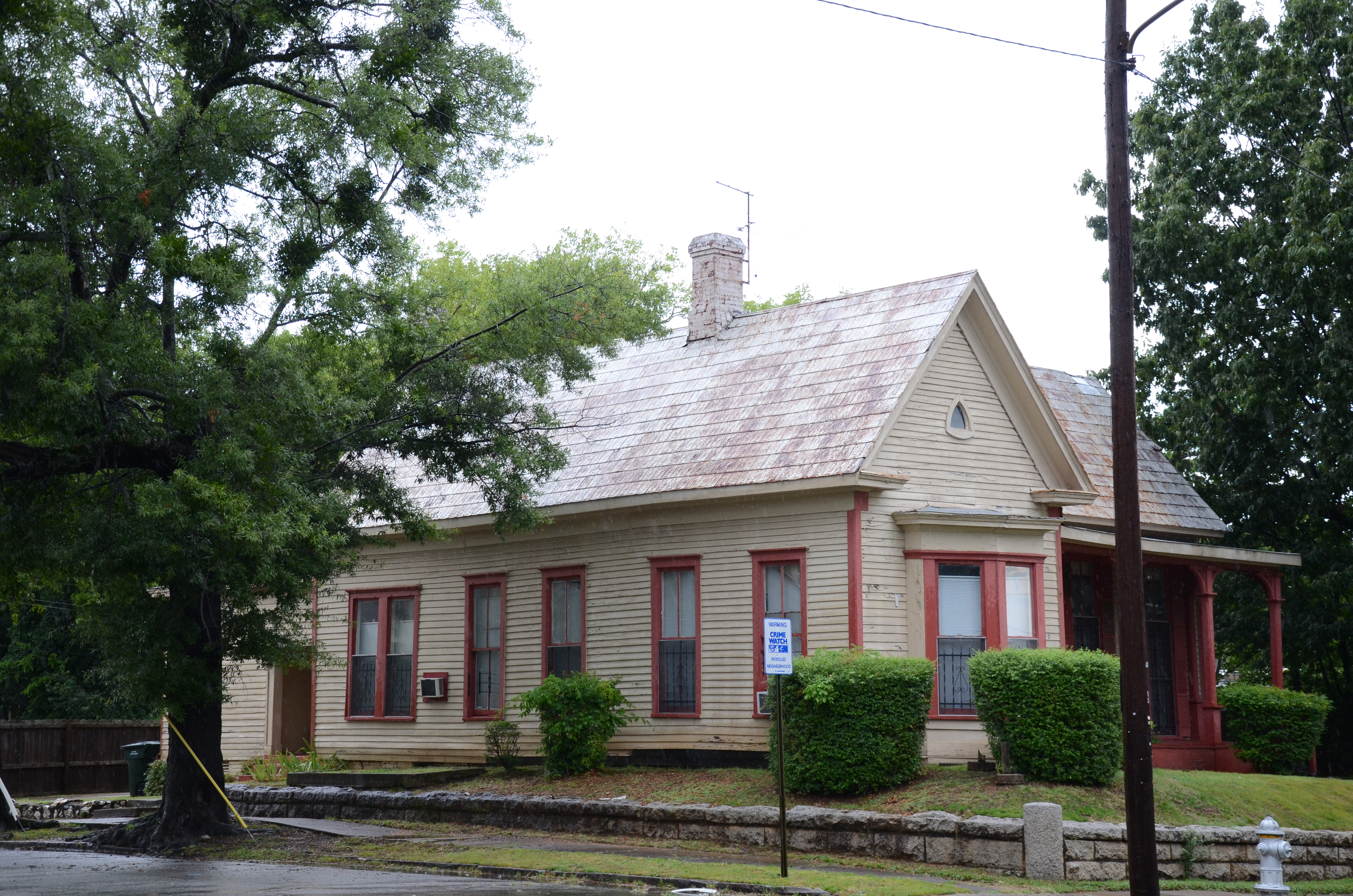

- Location within Arkansas Location within the United States
- Location: South Main St. from 19th St. to 24th St., Little Rock, Arkansas
- Coordinates: 34°43′41″N 92°16′26″W
- Area: 14.3 acres (5.8 ha)
- Built: 1880
- Architect: Charles L. Thompson, Wittenberg-Belony-Watts, et al.
- Architectural style: Bungalow/craftsman, Art Deco, et al.
- NRHP reference No.: 07000436 (original); 12000857 (increase)

Significant dates
- Added to NRHP: July 12, 2007
- Boundary increase: October 17, 2012

The South Main Street Residential Historic District encompasses a residential area south of downtown Little Rock, Arkansas. The area, extending along South Main Street roughly between 19th and 23rd Streets, was developed between about 1880 and 1945, and includes a well-preserved set of residential architecture from that period. Notable buildings include the Luxor Apartments, the Holcomb Court Apartments, and the Ada Thompson Memorial Home.

The district was listed on the National Register of Historic Places in 2007. In 2012 it was enlarged to include the west side of the 2000 block of Scott Street.

== See also ==
- South Main Street Commercial Historic District (Little Rock, Arkansas)
- National Register of Historic Places listings in Little Rock, Arkansas
