= Abraham and Mollie Froug House =

Historic house in Little Rock, AR

- U.S. National Register of Historic Places
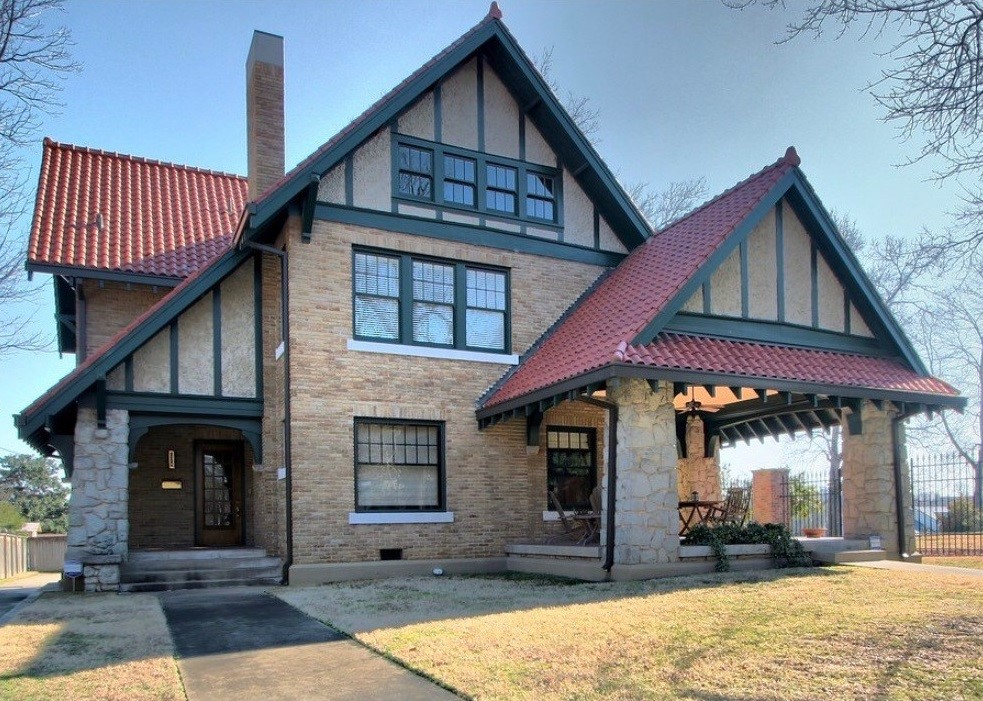

- Location within Arkansas Location within the United States
- Location: 1727 Center Street Little Rock, AR 72206
- Coordinates: 34.7317339°N 92.2757561°W
- Area: Less than 1 acre
- Built: 1919-1920
- Architect: Charles L. Thompson
- Architectural style: Craftsman Style
- Part of: Governor's Mansion Historic District

The Abraham and Mollie Froug House, located at 1727 South Center Street in Little Rock, Arkansas, is a historic residential property adjacent to the Arkansas Governor's Mansion.

== Description ==
The site includes a main house, a detached garage, and a large wooden pergola. Both the house and garage are frame structures clad in buff brick with red terra cotta tile gabled roofs, featuring matching architectural details such as brick chimneys with cast-stone caps, decorative brackets, and exposed rafter tails. The house also includes stucco and half-timbering in the gables, stone and tapered porch columns, and rests on a foundation of partial basement and crawlspace, while the garage sits on a concrete slab. The property slopes gently eastward and is mostly lawn-covered with minimal tree coverage.

This house was listed on the National Register of Historic Places on May 13, 2022.

== Significance ==
Completed in 1920, the Abraham and Mollie Froug House is considered one of the most notable examples of Craftsman-style architecture in the Little Rock area. Designed by architect Charles L. Thompson, the house features characteristic elements of the style, including tapered stone columns, cross-gable roofs, multi-pane over single-pane windows, and decorative stick work in the gables. Although larger examples of the Craftsman style are present in the region, the Froug House's more modest scale aligns more closely with the style's original association with middle- and upper-middle-class residential design.

== See also ==
- National Register of Historic Places listings in Little Rock, Arkansas
- Governor's Mansion Historic District
