= Croxson House =

Historic house in Arkansas, United States

- U.S. National Register of Historic Places
- U.S. Historic district – Contributing property
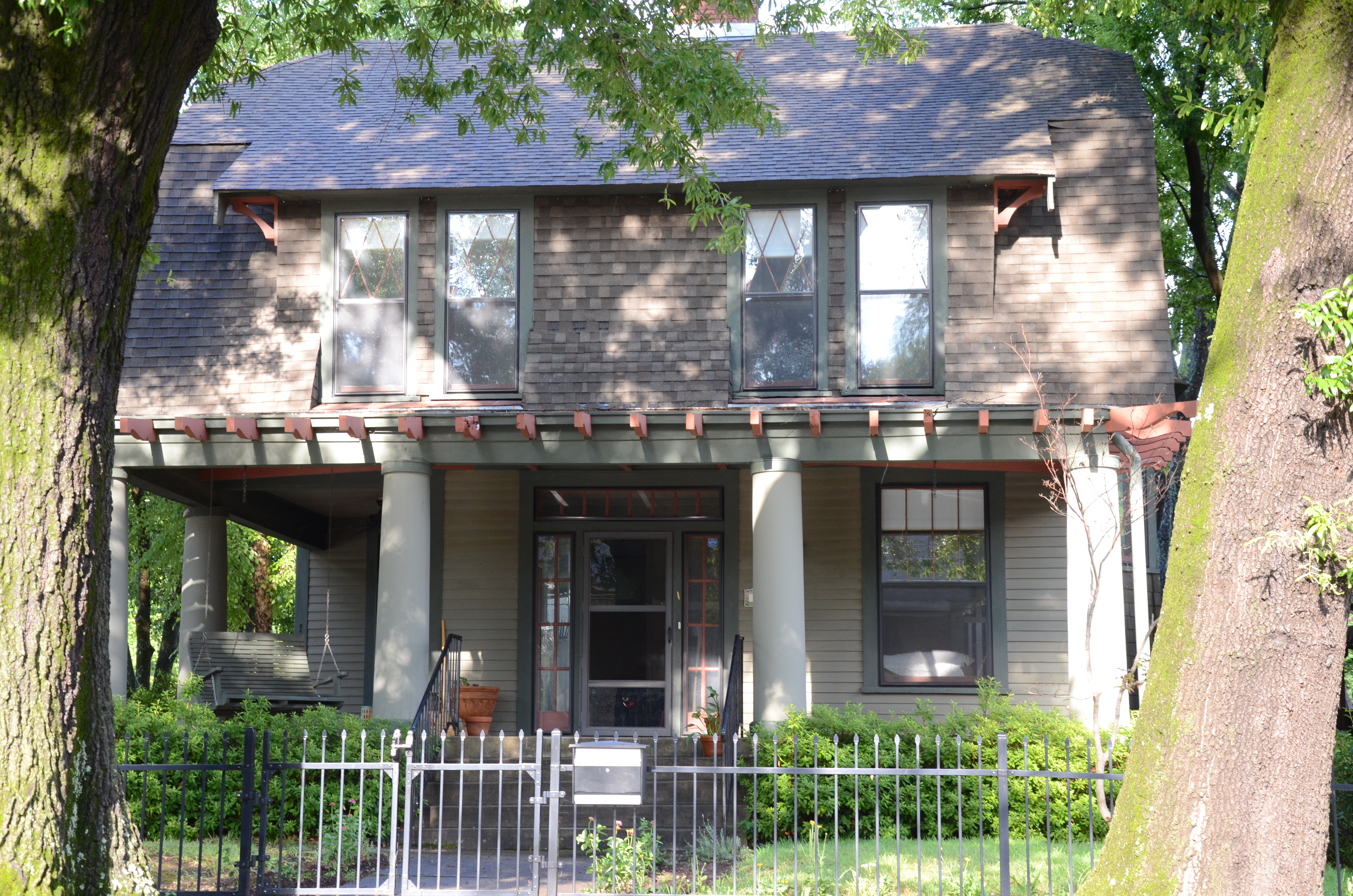

- Location within Arkansas Location within the United States
- Location: 1901 Gaines St., Little Rock, Arkansas
- Coordinates: 34°43′49″N 92°16′50″W
- Area: less than one acre
- Built: 1908
- Architect: Charles L. Thompson
- Architectural style: Colonial Revival, Dutch Colonial
- Part of: Governor's Mansion Historic District (ID88000631)
- MPS: Thompson, Charles L., Design Collection TR
- NRHP reference No.: 82000883

Significant dates
- Added to NRHP: December 22, 1982
- Designated CP: May 19, 1988

The Croxson House is a historic house in Little Rock, Arkansas. It is a two-story frame structure, with a side gambrel roof that has wide shed-roof dormers, and clapboard siding. A porch extends across the front, supported by heavy Tuscan columns, with brackets lining its eave. The house was built in 1908 to a design by the noted Arkansas architect Charles L. Thompson. It is well-preserved example of Thompson's Dutch Colonial designs.

The house was listed on the National Register of Historic Places in 1982, and was included in an enlargement of the Governor's Mansion Historic District.

== See also ==
- National Register of Historic Places listings in Little Rock, Arkansas
