= Schaer House =

Historic house in Arkansas, United States

- U.S. National Register of Historic Places
- U.S. Historic district – Contributing property
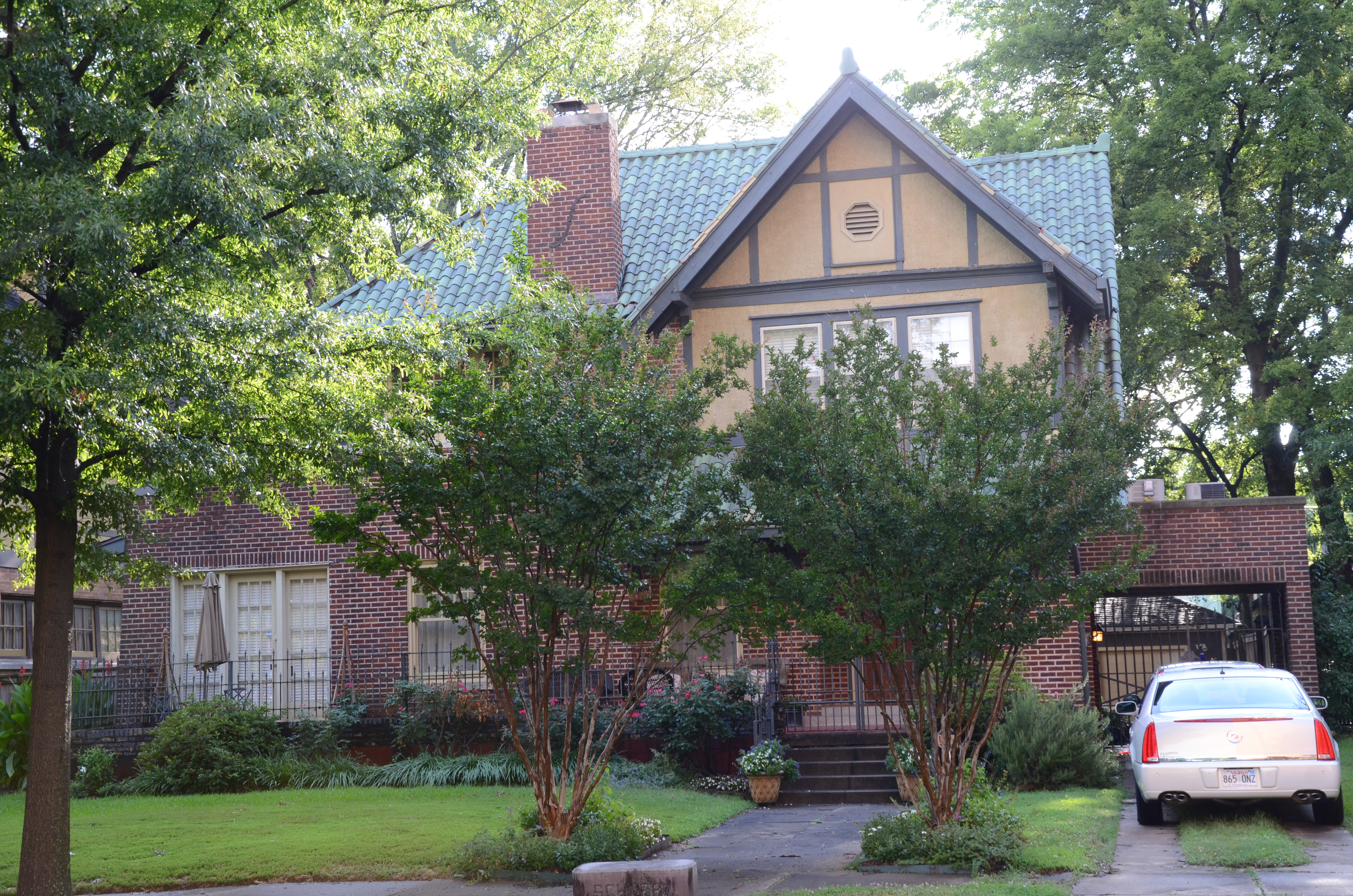

- Location within Arkansas Location within the United States
- Location: 1862 Arch St., Little Rock, Arkansas
- Coordinates: 34°43′51″N 92°16′47″W
- Area: less than one acre
- Built: 1923
- Architect: Thompson & Harding
- Architectural style: Bungalow/American craftsman
- Part of: Governor's Mansion Historic District (ID78000620)
- MPS: Thompson, Charles L., Design Collection TR
- NRHP reference No.: 82000926

Significant dates
- Added to NRHP: December 22, 1982
- Designated CP: September 13, 1978

The Schaer House is a historic house at 1862 Arch Street in Little Rock, Arkansas. It is an asymmetrical two story brick house in the Tudor Revival style, designed by Thompson and Harding and built in 1923. Its main roof extends from side to side, with a hip at one end and a gable at the other. On the right side of the front facade, the roof descends to the first floor, with a large half-timbered cross gable section projecting. It also has an irregular window arrangement, with bands of three casement windows in the front cross gable, and on the first floor left side, with two sash windows in the center and the main entrance on the right.

The house was listed on the National Register of Historic Places in 1982.

== See also ==
- National Register of Historic Places listings in Little Rock, Arkansas
