= Winfield Methodist Church =

Historic church in Arkansas, United States

- U.S. National Register of Historic Places
- U.S. Historic district – Contributing property
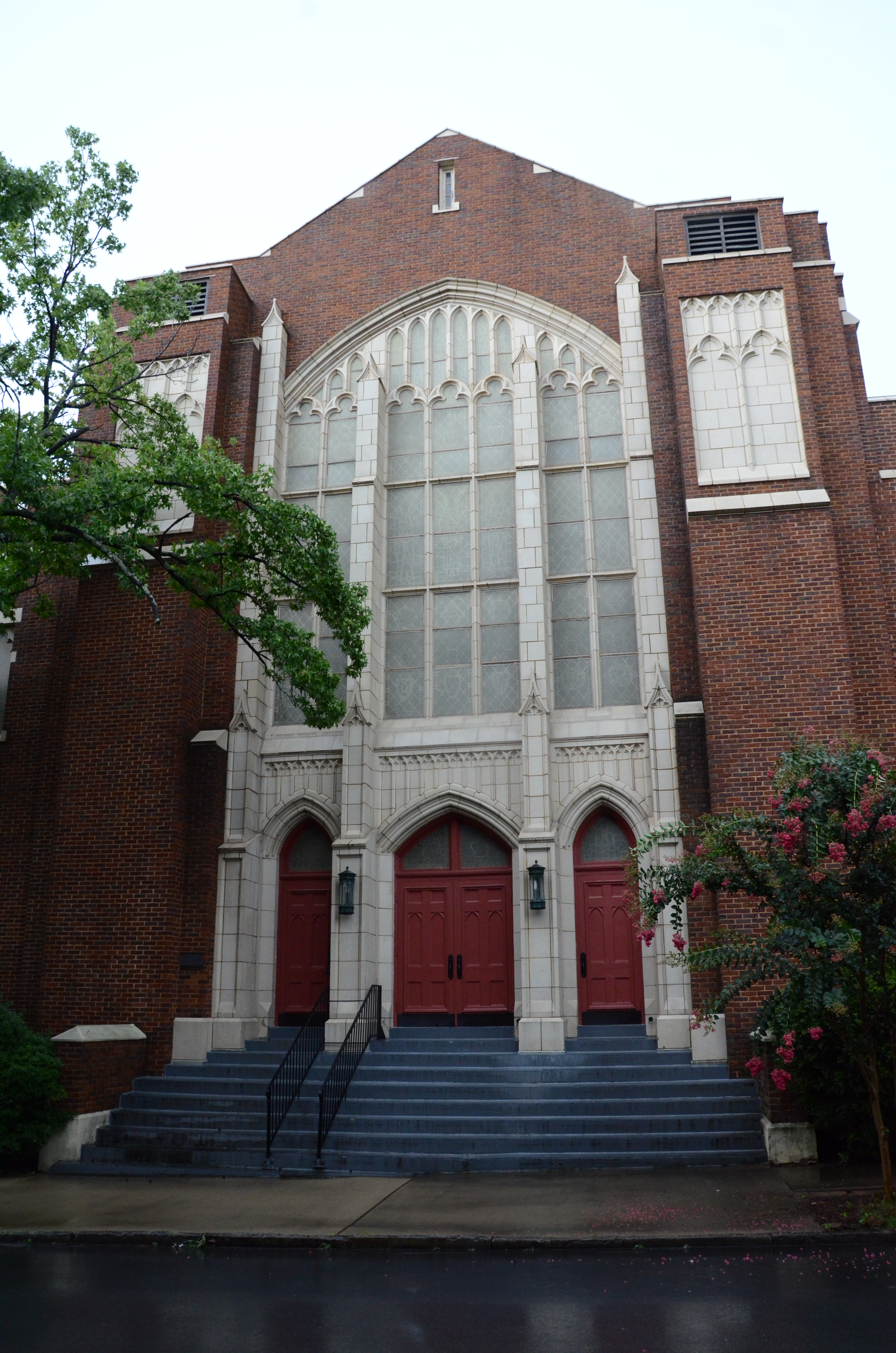

- Location within Arkansas Location within the United States
- Location: 1601 Louisiana, Little Rock, Arkansas
- Coordinates: 34°43′59″N 92°16′26″W
- Area: less than one acre
- Built: 1921
- Architect: Thompson & Harding
- Architectural style: Late Gothic Revival
- Part of: Governor's Mansion Historic District (ID78000620)
- MPS: Thompson, Charles L., Design Collection TR
- NRHP reference No.: 82000935

Significant dates
- Added to NRHP: December 22, 1982
- Designated CP: September 13, 1978

Quapaw Quarter United Methodist Church, formerly the Winfield Methodist Church is a historic church at 1601 Louisiana Street in Little Rock, Arkansas. It is a two-story brick building with Gothic Revival style, designed by the prominent architectural firm of Thompson and Harding, and built in 1921. Its main facade has three entrances below a large Gothic-arch stained glass window, all framed by cream-colored terra cotta elements. A square tower rises above the center of the transept.

The church was listed on the National Register of Historic Places in 1982.

== See also ==
- National Register of Historic Places listings in Little Rock, Arkansas
