= Beyerlein House =

Historic house in Arkansas, United States

- U.S. National Register of Historic Places
- U.S. Historic district – Contributing property
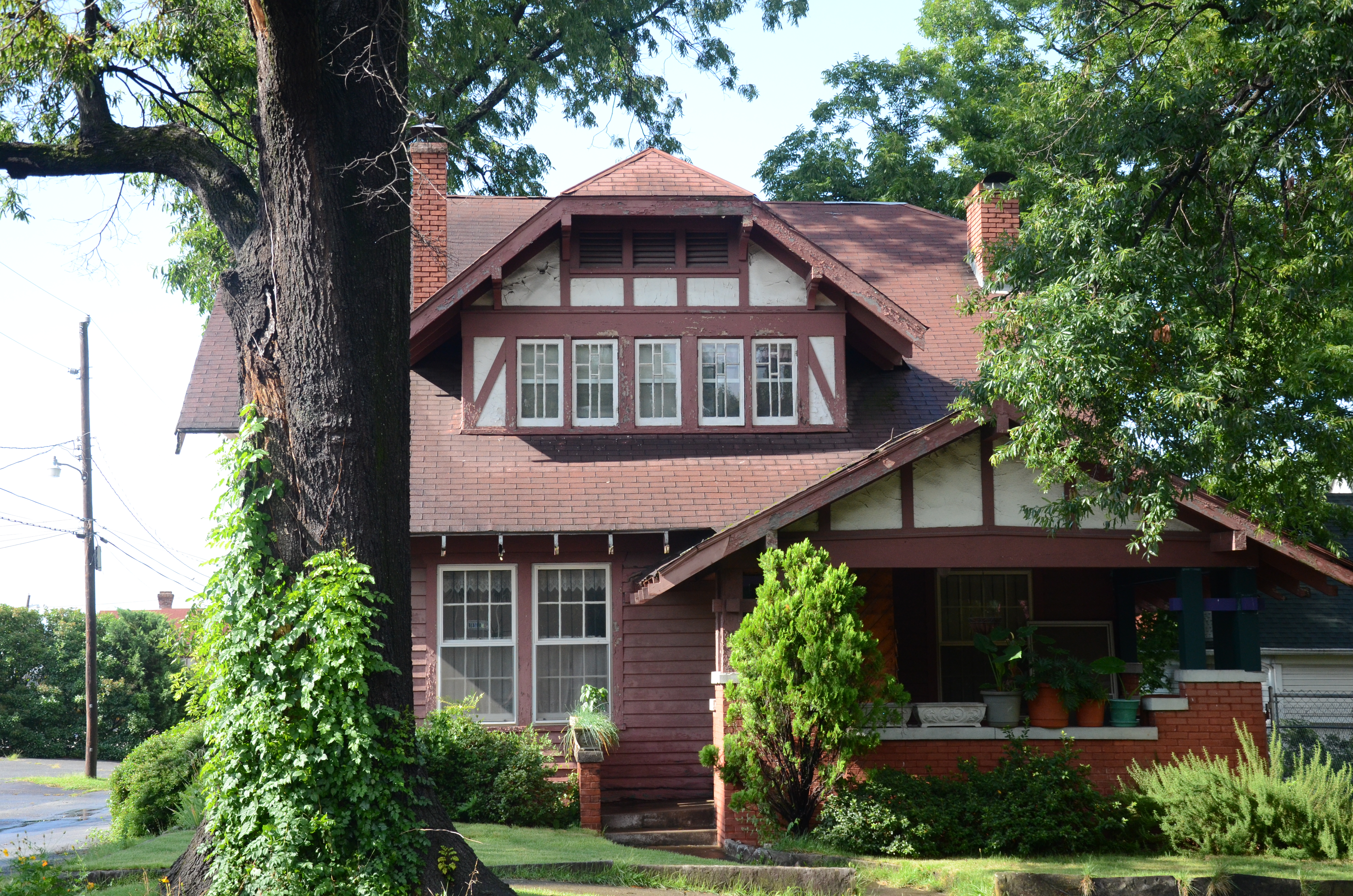

- Location within Arkansas Location within the United States
- Location: 412 W. 14th St., Little Rock, Arkansas
- Coordinates: 34°44′10″N 92°16′36″W
- Area: less than one acre
- Built: 1917
- Architect: Charles L. Thompson
- Architectural style: Bungalow/Craftsman
- Part of: Governor's Mansion Historic District (ID78000620)
- MPS: Thompson, Charles L., Design Collection TR
- NRHP reference No.: 82000878

Significant dates
- Added to NRHP: December 22, 1982
- Designated CP: September 13, 1978

The Beyerlein House is a historic house at 412 W. 14th St. in Little Rock, Arkansas, USA. It is a 1½-story wood-frame structure with a clipped-gable roof, featuring weatherboard siding on the first floor and half-timbered stucco in the gables. A porch extends from the right side of the front façade, incorporating a low brick balcony and brick piers that support squat posts carrying the gabled roof above. The gables exhibit exposed rafter tails, characteristic of the Craftsman style. The house was built in 1917 to a design by Charles L. Thompson.

The house was listed on the National Register of Historic Places in 1982 for its architecture. It is also included as a contributing building in a boundary increase of the Governor's Mansion Historic District, which is also listed on the National Register.
