= Halliburton Townhouses =

Historic houses in Arkansas, United States

- U.S. National Register of Historic Places
- U.S. Historic district – Contributing property
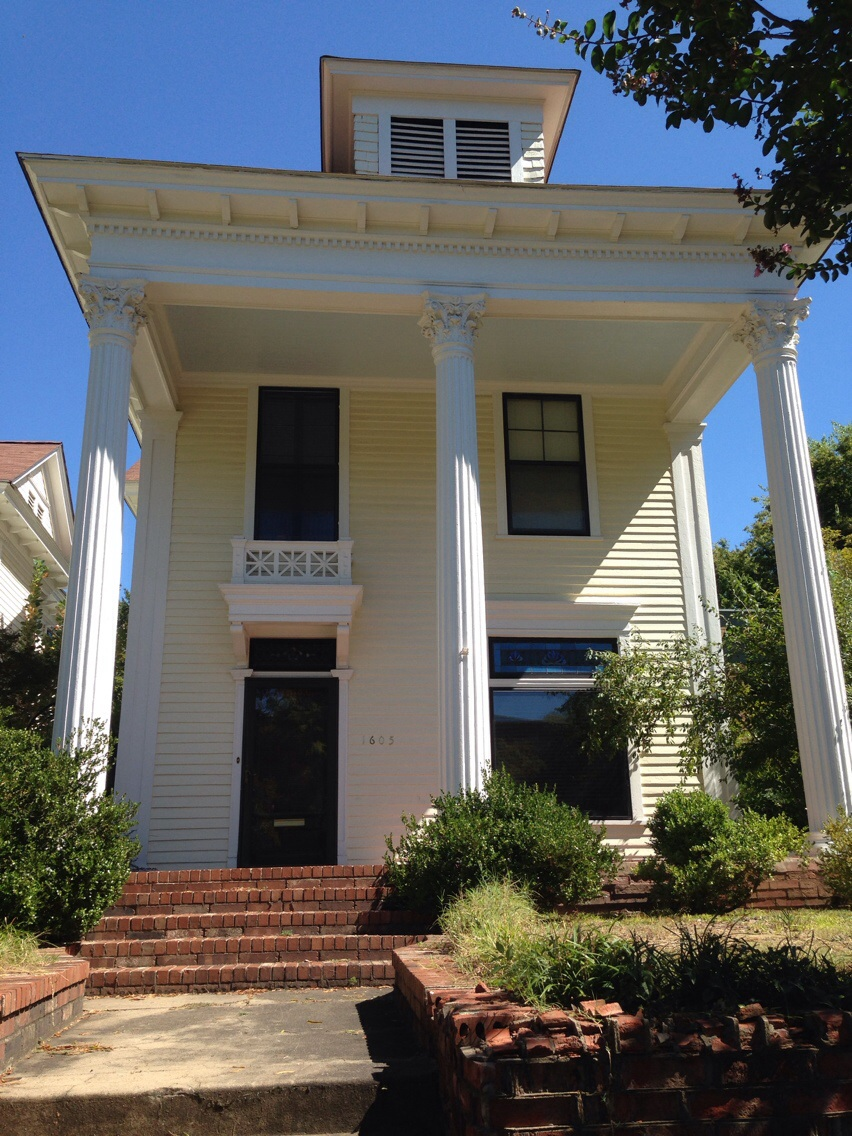
- 1605 Center St.

- Location within Arkansas Location within the United States
- Location: 1601 and 1605 Center St., Little Rock, Arkansas
- Coordinates: 34°44′1″N 92°16′31″W
- Area: less than one acre
- Built: 1905
- Architectural style: Classical Revival
- Part of: Governor's Mansion Historic District (1988 enlargement) (ID88000631)
- NRHP reference No.: 76000455

Significant dates
- Added to NRHP: December 12, 1976
- Designated CP: May 19, 1988

The Halliburton Townhouses are a pair of virtually identical residential buildings at 1601 and 1605 Center Street in Little Rock, Arkansas. They are two story wood frame Classical Revival structures, dominated by oversides two-story gabled porticos supported by Corinthian columns. They were built in 1905 or 1906 in what was then one of the most fashionable neighborhoods of the city. They were probably built by Thomas Halliburton, a prominent local landowner who once ran for mayor.

The houses were listed on the National Register of Historic Places in 1976.

== See also ==
- National Register of Historic Places listings in Little Rock, Arkansas
