= Arkansas School for the Blind and Visually Impaired =

Public school in Little Rock, Arkansas, United States

Arkansas School for the Blind
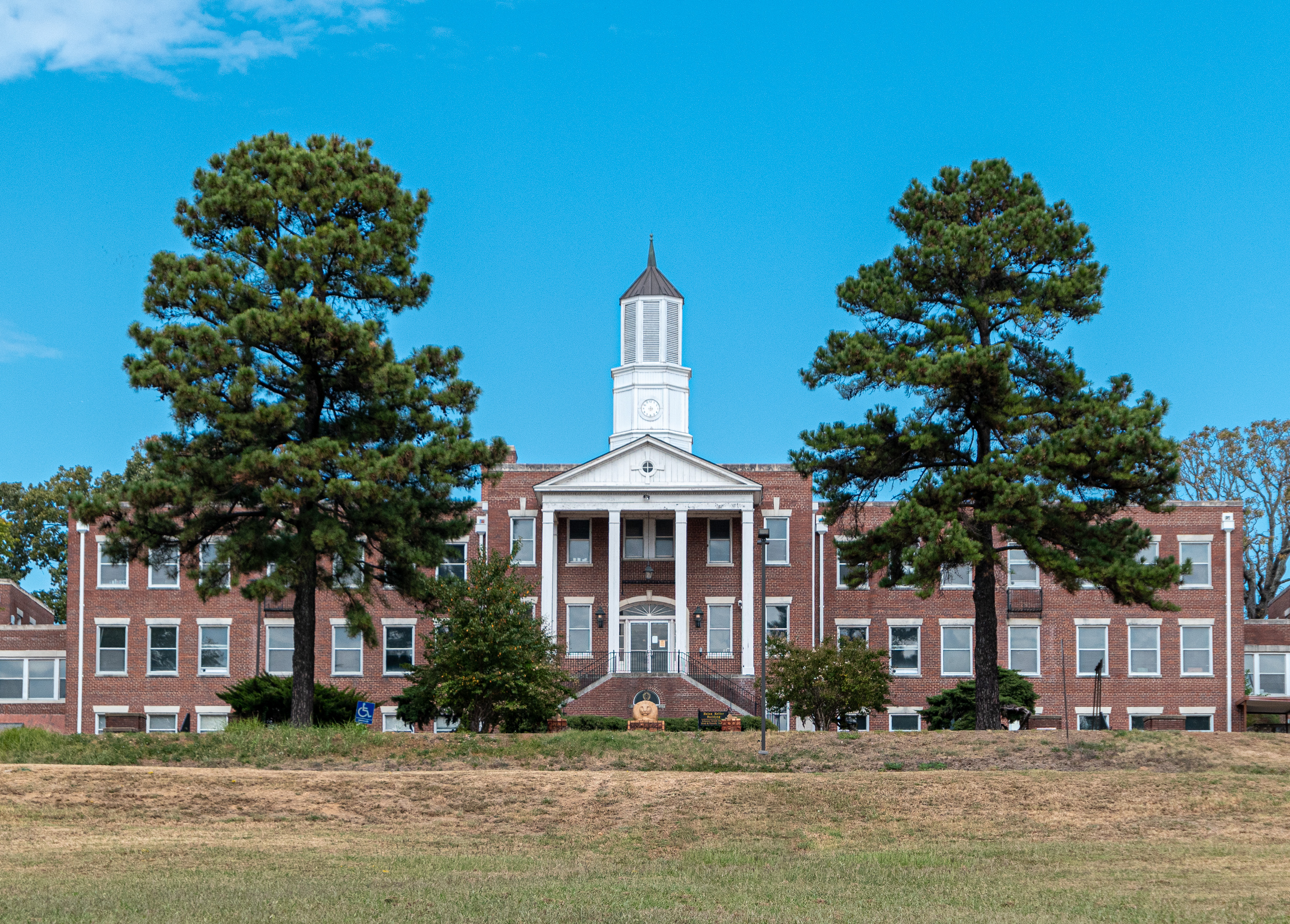

Location
- 2600 West Markham Street; Little Rock, Pulaski County, Arkansas 72203; United States; 34°45′09″N 92°18′13″W

Information
- Type: Public/Blind
- Established: 1859 (167 years ago)
- School district: Arkansas School for the Blind
- NCES District ID: 0500035
- CEEB code: 041415
- Principal: Lori Cole
- Teaching staff: 33.53 (on FTE basis)
- Grades: PK–12
- Enrollment: 87 (2021–2022)
- Student to teacher ratio: 2.59
- Colors: Black and gold
- Sports: Track and Field, Wrestling, Goalball, Cheer
- Mascot: Lion
- Team name: Arkansas School for the Blind Lions
- Affiliations: North Central Association of Schools for the Blind; Arkansas Activities Association
- Website: asbvi.ade.arkansas.gov

The Arkansas School for the Blind and Visually Impaired (ASB or ASBVI), is a state-run public school in Little Rock, Arkansas, United States, serving blind and vision impaired students of kindergarten through high school grades through residential, day school, and part-time enrollment programs.

== History ==
Arkansas School for the Blind and Visually Impaired

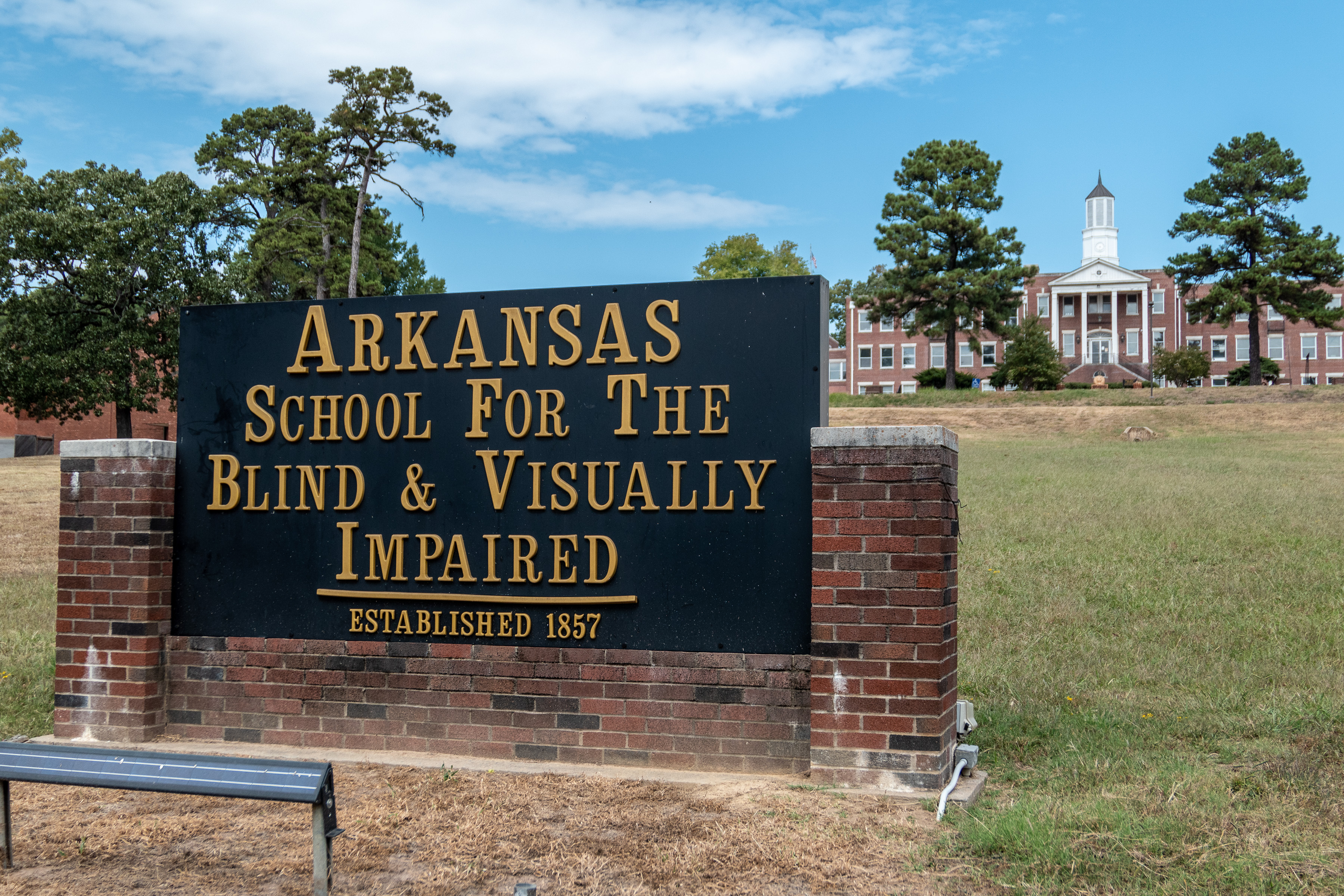
Sign

Opened in 1859, the school was founded as The Institute for the Education of the Blind by Reverend Haucke, a blind Baptist minister. Originally located in Arkadelphia, Arkansas, the school moved in 1868 to Little Rock in the facility now used as the Arkansas Governor's Mansion. By 1877, the school was renamed to its present-day Arkansas School for the Blind. On October 9, 1939, construction of the school's new campus at 2600 West Markham Street was complete and dedicated to Helen Keller, who was in attendance.

The Arkansas Department of Education classifies it as a school district.

== Schools ==
Located within the same campus facilities are the following schools:

- Arkansas School for the Blind High School—serves approximately 50 students in grades 7 through 12.
- Arkansas School for the Blind Elementary School—serves approximately 50 students in prekindergarten through grade 6.

== Extracurricular activities ==
The Arkansas School for the Blind mascot and athletic emblem is the Lion with black and gold serving as the school colors.

=== Athletics ===
For the 2012–2014 school years, the ASBVI Lions compete in the 1A Classification—the state's smallest classification—within the 1A Region 5 Conference, as administered by the Arkansas Activities Association in competition with the state's public and private schools. Also, ASB is a member of the North Central Association of Schools for the Blind. The Lions compete in track and field (boys/girls), wrestling, goalball, and cheer.

== Campus ==
The school has a dormitory available for students.

== Notable alumni ==
- Al Hibbler – Baritone vocalist
- Ved Mehta – Author

== See also ==
- Blindness and education
