= Lincoln Building (Little Rock, Arkansas) =

- U.S. National Register of Historic Places
- U.S. Historic district – Contributing property
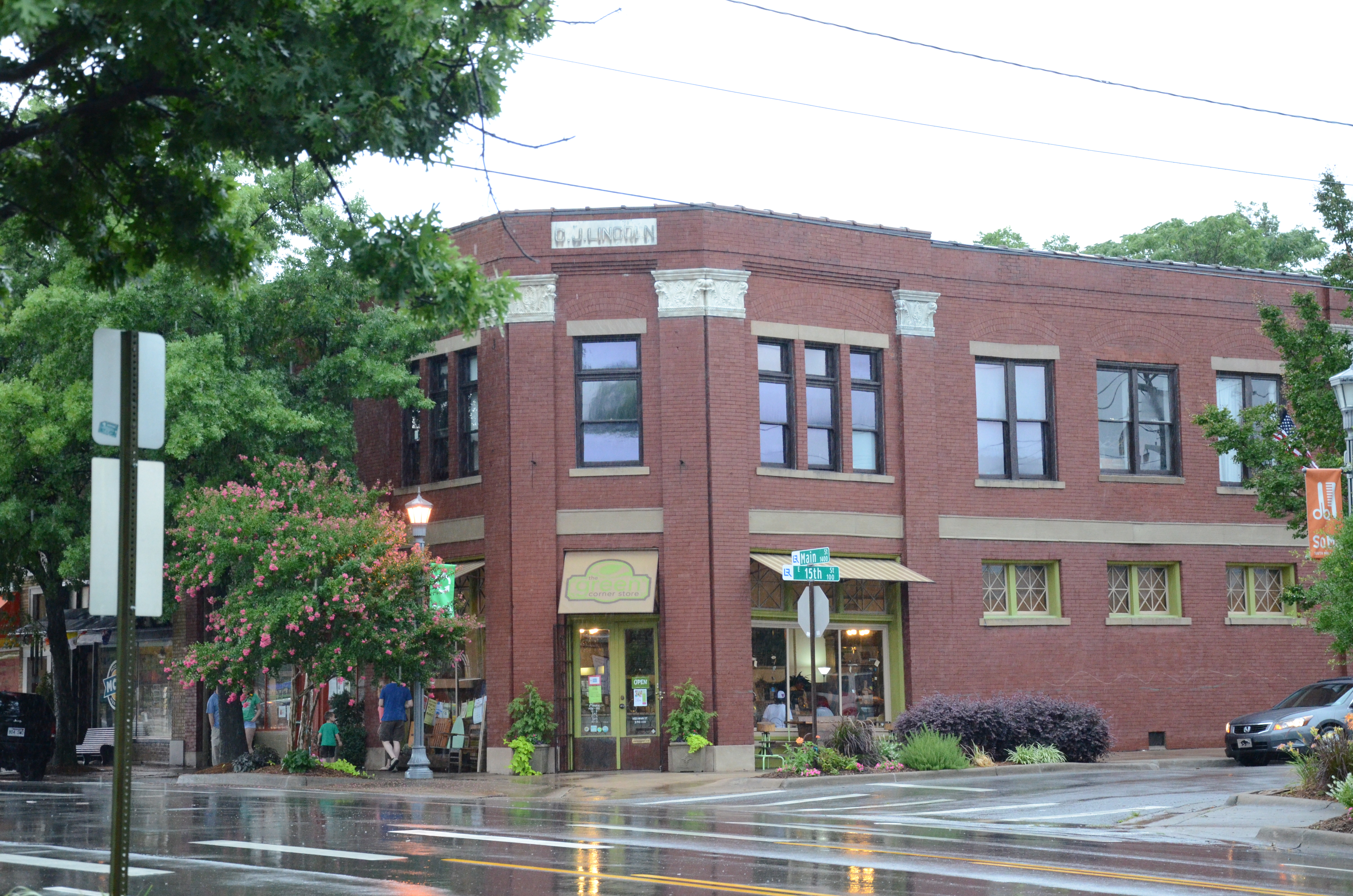

- Location within Arkansas Location within the United States
- Location: 1423-1425 S. Main St., Little Rock, Arkansas
- Coordinates: 34°44′4″N 92°16′21″W
- Area: less than one acre
- Built: 1905
- Architectural style: Classical Revival
- Part of: South Main Street Commercial Historic District (ID07000435)
- NRHP reference No.: 94000826

Significant dates
- Added to NRHP: August 5, 1994
- Designated CP: August 31, 2007

The Lincoln Building is a historic commercial building at 1423-25 South Main Street in Little Rock, Arkansas. It is a two-story brick structure, built in 1905 with modest Neoclassical design elements, including bays articulated by brick pilasters with metal Corinthian capitals. It was built as a speculative real estate venture by C. J. Lincoln, a local drugstore wholesaler, and is one of the South Main Street area's best examples of the style.

The building was listed on the National Register of Historic Places in 1994.

== See also ==
- National Register of Historic Places listings in Little Rock, Arkansas
