= Ved Mehta =

Indian-American writer (1934-2021)

- Born: Ved Parkash Mehta; 21 March 1934; Lahore, Punjab, British Raj
- Died: 9 January 2021 (aged 86); Manhattan, New York, U.S.
- Education: Dadar School for the Blind; Arkansas School for the Blind
- Alma mater: Pomona College (BA); Balliol College, Oxford (BA); Harvard University (MA)
- Occupations: Writer; journalist
- Spouse: Linn Cary (m. 1983)
- Writing career
- Language: English
- Years active: 1957–2004
- Website: vedmehta.com

Ved Parkash Mehta (21 March 1934 – 9 January 2021) was an Indian-born writer who lived and worked mainly in the United States. Blind from an early age, Mehta is best known for an autobiography published in installments from 1972 to 2004. He wrote for The New Yorker for many years.

== Early life and education ==
Mehta was born on 21 March 1934 in Lahore, British India (now in Pakistan), to a Punjabi Hindu family. His parents were Shanti (Mehra) Mehta and Amolak Ram Mehta (1894–1986), a senior public health official in the government of India.

Ved lost his sight at the age of three due to cerebrospinal meningitis. Due to the limited prospects for blind people at that time, his parents sent him over 1,300 miles (2,100 km) away to the Dadar School for the Blind in Bombay (present-day Mumbai). Beginning around 1949, he attended the Arkansas School for the Blind.

Mehta received a BA from Pomona College in 1956; a BA from Balliol College, Oxford, in 1959, where he read modern history; and an MA from Harvard University in 1961. While at Pomona, as very few books were available in Braille, Mehta used student readers, one of whom was Eugene Rose, who went on to become the Russian Orthodox hieromonk Seraphim Rose. Mehta referred to him in two books, one of which was Stolen Light, his second book of memoirs: "I felt very lucky to have found Gene as a reader. ... He read with such clarity that I almost had the illusion that he was explaining things."

== Career ==
His first book, an autobiography called Face to Face, which placed his early life in the context of Indian politics, history and Anglo-Indian relations, was published in 1957; its narrative ends around the time Mehta enrolled at Pomona. Mehta published his first novel, Delinquent Chacha, in 1966. It was serialized in The New Yorker. He subsequently wrote more than 24 books, including several that deal with the subject of blindness, as well as hundreds of articles and short stories, for British, Indian and American publications. He was a staff writer at The New Yorker from 1961 to 1994.

A 1982 profile, published after Mehta was announced as a MacArthur Fellow, stated that he had "gained critical note as a weaver of profiles, as an interviewer who can interpret character and context in the exchange of words with a subject. He is scholarly and journalistic and, above all, a man who thinks things out." In 1989, Jennet Conant produced an article for Spy reflecting on the alleged decline in quality of the New Yorker after the departure of editor William Shawn; recounting criticism of the new editor's "peculiar hobbies" including collecting "aluminium tumblers and plastic handbags", mockery and attacking of "previously untouchable" journalists including Renata Adler and Janet Malcolm, and the fact that "the legions of loyal, tight-lipped young women- the secretaries, typists, fact-checkers and editorial assistants" had begun to "talk. Well, moan, really. Sob. Whine. Wail and complain" about "old wounds and ... past injustices", particularly those who were employed to "painstakingly transcribe" what Conant considered the "long-winded, self-obsessed, Oxford-educated English prose" of Mehta, who the article also accused of being unduly demanding and critical of the young women thus employed, asking them personal questions about their habits and lives. He left the magazine after, as he claimed, he was "terminated" by editor Tina Brown.

One of the articles he wrote for The New Yorker in 1961 consisted of interviews with Oxford philosophers. A volume of the letters of one of those philosophers, Isaiah Berlin, contains an honest response to Mehta's inquiry about the reactions of his subjects: "You ask me what the reactions of my colleagues are to your piece on Oxford Philosophy.... [T]hose to whom I have spoken are in various degrees outraged or indignant.... The New Yorker is a satirical magazine, and I assume from the start that a satire was intended and not an accurate representation of the truth. In any case, only a serious student of philosophy could attempt to do that." The article was published as a book, now including other public intellectuals, as Fly and the Fly-Bottle: Encounters with British Intellectuals (1962).

Mehta's autobiography, titled Continents of Exile, was published in 12 instalments between 1972 and 2004. Its first volume, Daddyji (1972), is part autobiography and part biography of Mehta's father. Mehta became an American citizen in 1975.

== Personal life ==
In 1983 he married Linn Fenimore Cooper Cary, the daughter of William Lucius Cary and Katherine Lemoine Fenimore Cary; his wife's mother was a descendant of James Fenimore Cooper and the niece of Mehta's former New Yorker colleague, Henry Sage Fenimore Cooper, Jr.

A 1978 profile by Madhur Jaffrey wrote that Mehta regarded himself as "part Indian", "part English", "part American", and as an "expatriate".

Mehta died on 9 January 2021, with complications from Parkinson's disease.

== Publications ==
=== Continents of Exile ===
1. Daddyji. Farrar, Straus and Giroux. 1972. ISBN 0-374-13438-3. OCLC 772323.
2. Mamaji. 1979.
3. Vedi. 1982.
4. The Ledge Between the Streams. 1984.
5. Sound-Shadows of the New World. 1986.
6. The Stolen Light. 1989.
7. Up at Oxford. 1993.
8. Haunted by Harvard. 2007 (written c. 1991).
9. Remembering Mr. Shawn's New Yorker: The Invisible Art of Editing. 1998.
10. All for Love. Thunder's Mouth Press; Nation Books. 2001. ISBN 1-56025-321-5. OCLC 45909210.
11. Dark Harbor: Building House and Home on an Enchanted Island. 2003.
12. The Red Letters: My Father's Enchanted Period. 2004.

=== Other books ===
- Face to Face: An Autobiography. Little, Brown. 1957. OCLC 264119.
- Walking the Indian Streets. Little, Brown. 1959. OCLC 1005945330.
- Fly and the Fly-Bottle: Encounters with British Intellectuals. Little, Brown. 1962. OCLC 2628711.
- The New Theologian. Harper and Row. 1965. OCLC 869281713.
- Delinquent Chacha. Harper & Row. 1966. OCLC 1406166.
- Portrait of India. Farrar, Straus and Giroux. 1970. OCLC 1086768025.
- John Is Easy to Please: Encounters with the Written and the Spoken Word. Penguin Books. 1974. ISBN 0-14-003707-1. OCLC 16232076.
- Mahatma Gandhi and His Apostles. Penguin Books. 1977. ISBN 0-14-004571-6. OCLC 3167789.
- The New India. Viking Press. 1978. ISBN 0-670-50735-0. OCLC 3167771.
- The Photographs of Chachaji
- A Family Affair: India under Three Prime Ministers. Oxford University Press. 1982. ISBN 0-19-503118-0. OCLC 8109459.
- Three Stories of the Raj
- Rajiv Gandhi and Rama's Kingdom
- A Ved Mehta Reader: The Craft of the Essay. Yale University Press. 1998. ISBN 0-300-07189-2. OCLC 37870626.

== Awards and honours ==
Mehta received Guggenheim Fellowships in 1971 and 1977. He was named a MacArthur Fellow in 1982, and was elected a fellow of the Royal Society of Literature in 2009. He received honorary degrees from Pomona College, Bard College, Williams College, the University of Stirling, and Bowdoin College.

== In popular culture ==
The 2021 American anthology comedy film The French Dispatch by director Wes Anderson mentioned Ved Mehta as one of the inspirations for his film, among other writers & editors of The New Yorker in the film's final credit rolling scene.

== See also ==
- Indians in the New York City metropolitan region
- New Yorkers in journalism

== Sources ==
- Justman, Stewart (2010). "The Advertisement of Guilt". Soundings: An Interdisciplinary Journal. 93 (1/2): 163–173. doi:10.5325/soundings.93.1.0163. ISSN 0038-1861. JSTOR 41200923. S2CID 246640983.
- Slatin, John M. (1986). "Blindness and Self-Perception: The Autobiographies of Ved Mehta". Mosaic: An Interdisciplinary Critical Journal. 19 (4): 173–193. ISSN 0027-1276. JSTOR 24777662.
