= First Hotze House =

Historic house in Arkansas, United States

- U.S. National Register of Historic Places
- U.S. Historic district – Contributing property
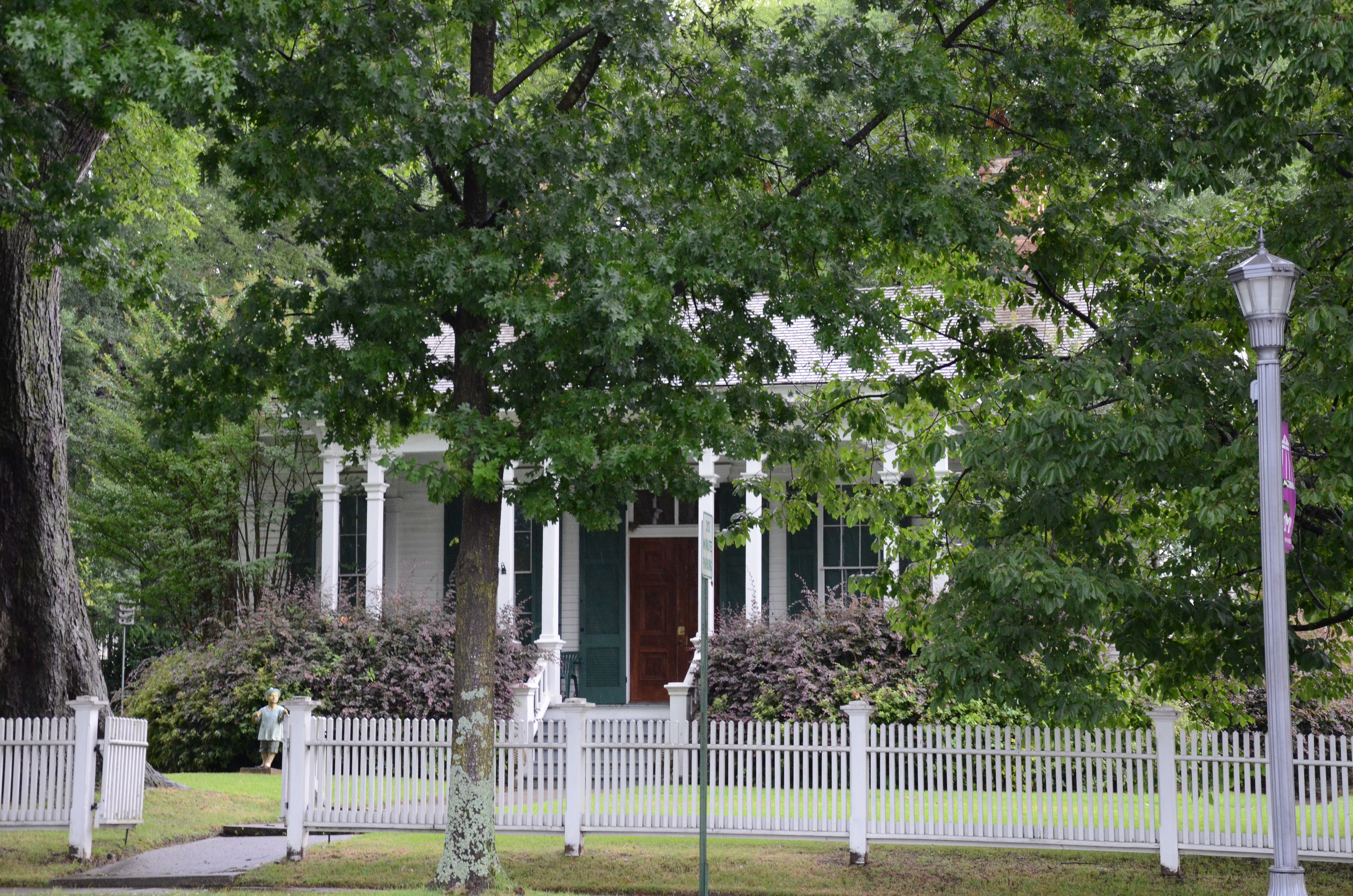

- Location within Arkansas Location within the United States
- Location: 1620 S. Main St., Little Rock, Arkansas
- Coordinates: 34°44′4″N 92°16′26″W
- Area: less than one acre
- Built: 1869
- Architect: M.H. Baldwin
- Architectural style: Italianate
- Part of: South Main Street Commercial Historic District (ID07000435)
- NRHP reference No.: 06000828

Significant dates
- Added to NRHP: September 20, 2006
- Designated CP: August 31, 2007

The First Hotze House is a historic house at 1620 South Main Street in Little Rock, Arkansas. Located in what was once the outskirts of the city, it is an L-shaped single story wood-frame structure, with a gabled roof, weatherboard trim, and a foundation of brick piers. A porch extends across most of its front facade, supported by paired square columns with brackets and a dentillated cornice. The building corners are adorned with Italianate pilasters and paired brackets. Built in 1869 and restored in 2000–01, it was the first post-Civil War home of Peter Hotze, a prominent local merchant and real estate developer. (His second, more elaborate home, stands just around the corner.)

The house was listed on the National Register of Historic Places in 2006.

== See also ==
- National Register of Historic Places listings in Little Rock, Arkansas
