= Hotze House =

Historic house in Arkansas, United States

- U.S. National Register of Historic Places
- U.S. Historic district – Contributing property
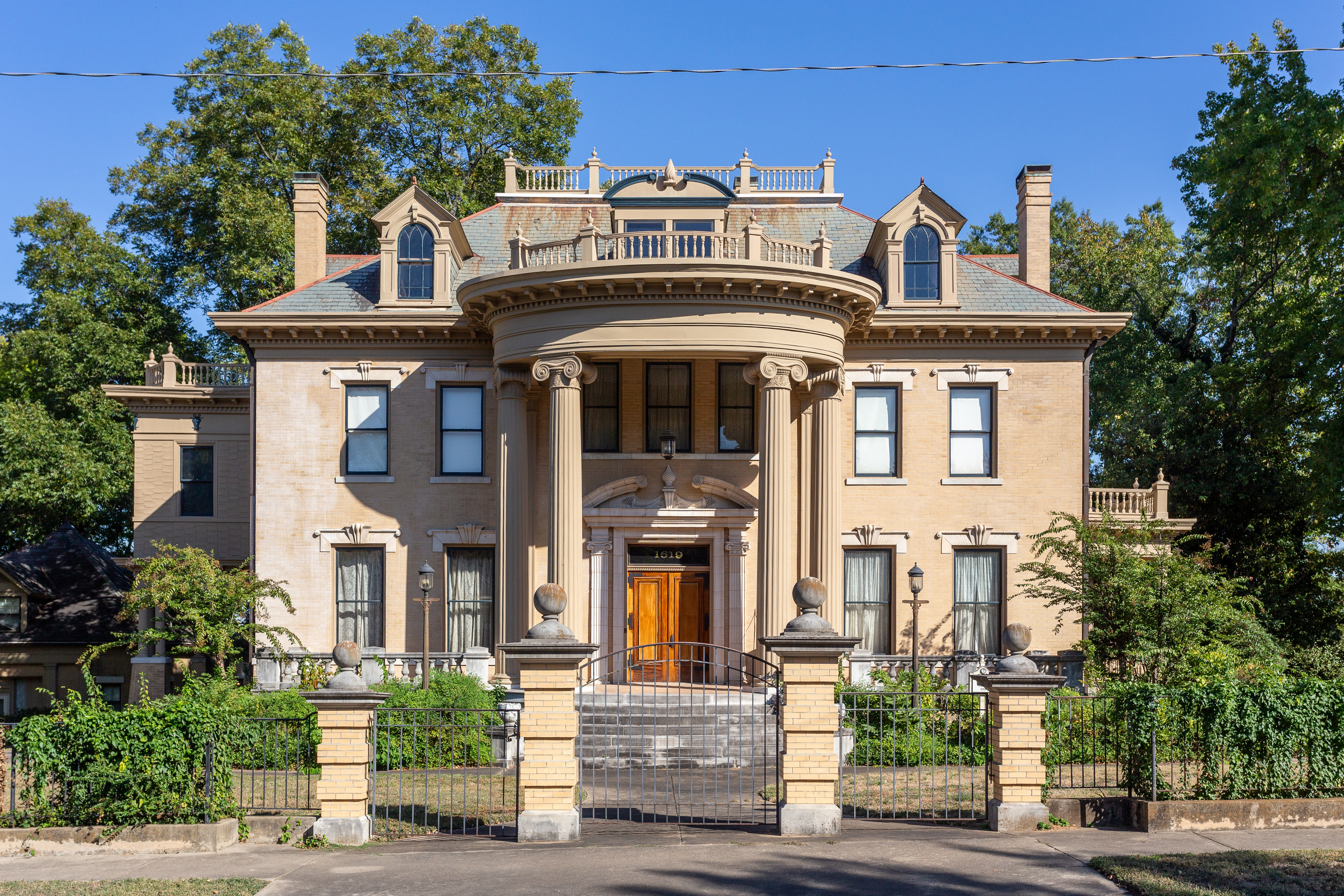

- Location within Arkansas Location within the United States
- Location: 1619 Louisiana St., Little Rock, Arkansas
- Coordinates: 34°43′58″N 92°16′27″W
- Area: less than one acre
- Built: 1900
- Architect: Charles L. Thompson
- Architectural style: Colonial Revival, Beaux Arts
- Part of: Governor's Mansion Historic District (1988 enlargement) (ID88000631)
- NRHP reference No.: 75000409

Significant dates
- Added to NRHP: August 11, 1975
- Designated CP: May 19, 1988

The Hotze House is a historic house at 1619 Louisiana Street in Little Rock, Arkansas. It is a 2 1/2-story brick structure, with a combination of Georgian Revival and Beaux Arts styling. Its main facade has an ornate half-round two-story portico sheltering the main entrance, with fluted Ionic columns and a modillioned cornice topped by a balustrade. Windows are topped by cut stone lintels. The hip roof is also topped by a balustrade. Built in 1900 to a design by Charles L. Thompson, its interior is claimed to have been designed by Louis Comfort Tiffany. Peter Hotze, for whom it was built, was a major cotton dealer.

The house was listed on the National Register of Historic Places in 1975.

== See also ==
- First Hotze House, just around the corner
- National Register of Historic Places listings in Little Rock, Arkansas
