= South Main Street Commercial Historic District (Little Rock, Arkansas) =

Historic district in Arkansas, United States

- U.S. National Register of Historic Places
- U.S. Historic district
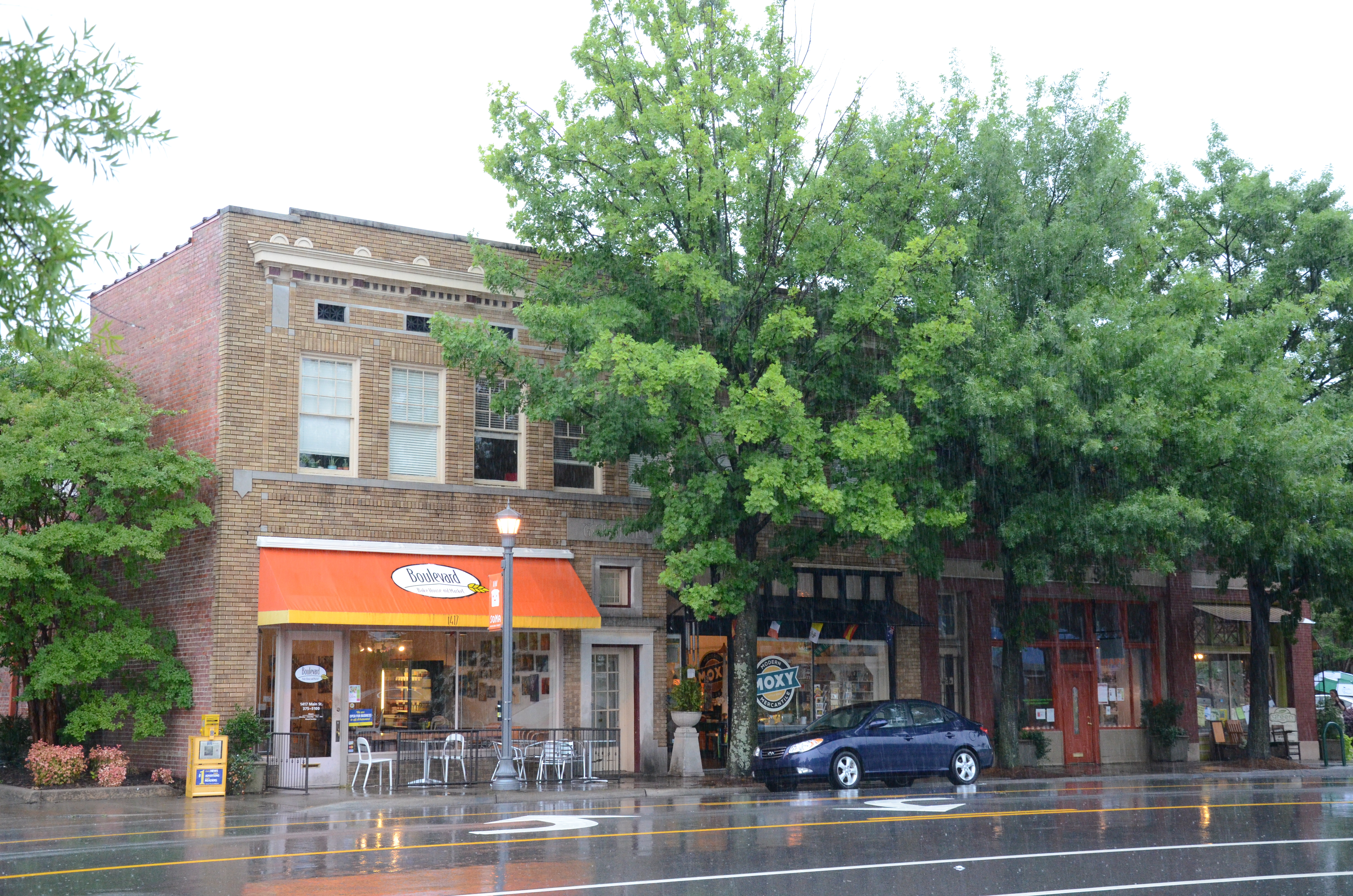

- Location within Arkansas Location within the United States
- Location: South Main St. from 12th St. to 17th St., Little Rock, Arkansas
- Coordinates: 34°44′5″N 92°16′23″W
- Area: 13.13 acres (5.31 ha)
- Built: 1905
- Architect: W.H. Baldwin
- Architectural style: Bungalow/Craftsman, Art Deco, et al.
- NRHP reference No.: 07000435
- Added to NRHP: August 31, 2007

The South Main Street Commercial Historic District of Little Rock, Arkansas is a historic district encompassing a five-block stretch of South Main Street, just south of the city's downtown area. Developed between about 1905 and 1950, the section of South Main between 12th and 17th streets represents an architectural cross-section of the commercial development that took place in the city during that time. Early buildings, such as the 1905 Lincoln Building, were Classical Revival in style, while generational changes in style are exemplified by the presence of Craftsman and Art Deco buildings. One residential building, the First Hotze House, predates the area's commercial development, and stands as a reminder of its residential past.

The district was listed on the National Register of Historic Places in 2007.

== See also ==
- National Register of Historic Places listings in Little Rock, Arkansas
