= Hornibrook House =

Historic house in Arkansas, United States

- U.S. National Register of Historic Places
- U.S. Historic district – Contributing property
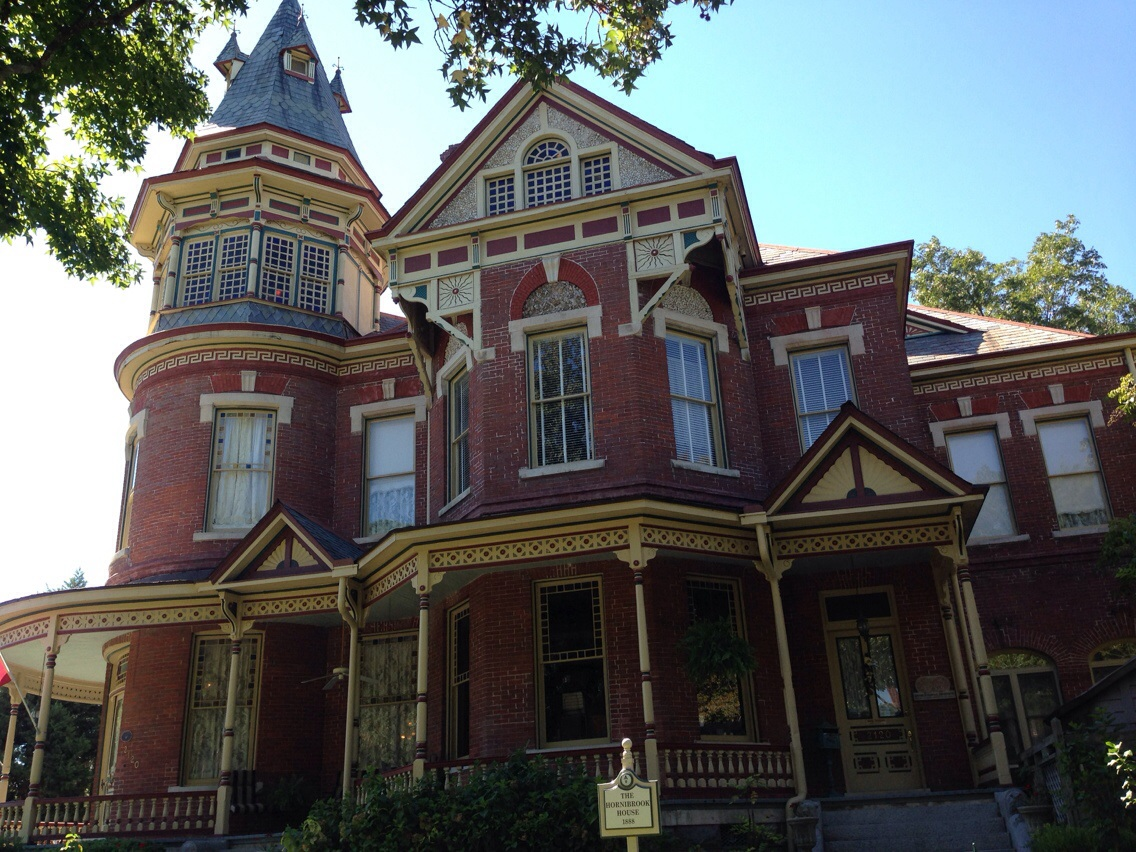

- Location within Arkansas Location within the United States
- Location: 2120 S. Louisiana St., Little Rock, Arkansas
- Coordinates: 34°43′40″N 92°16′30″W
- Area: less than one acre
- Built: 1888
- Architectural style: Late Victorian
- Part of: Governor's Mansion Historic District (1988 enlargement) (ID88000631)
- NRHP reference No.: 74000497

Significant dates
- Added to NRHP: July 30, 1974
- Designated CP: May 19, 1988

The Hornibrook House is a historic house at 2120 South Louisiana Street in Little Rock, Arkansas. It is a two-story brick structure, with the irregular massing and projecting gables typical of the Queen Anne style architecture, a Victorian revival style. Its wraparound porch is festooned with detailed woodwork, with turned posts and balustrade. A three-story rounded tower stands at one corner of the house, topped by an octagonal roof. Built in 1888, it is one of the state's finest examples of Queen Anne architecture, with unrivalled exterior and interior detail. It was built for James Hornibrook, a prominent local businessman.

The house was listed on the National Register of Historic Places in 1974.

== See also ==
- National Register of Historic Places listings in Little Rock, Arkansas
