= Arkansas Governor's Mansion =

- U.S. Historic district – Contributing property
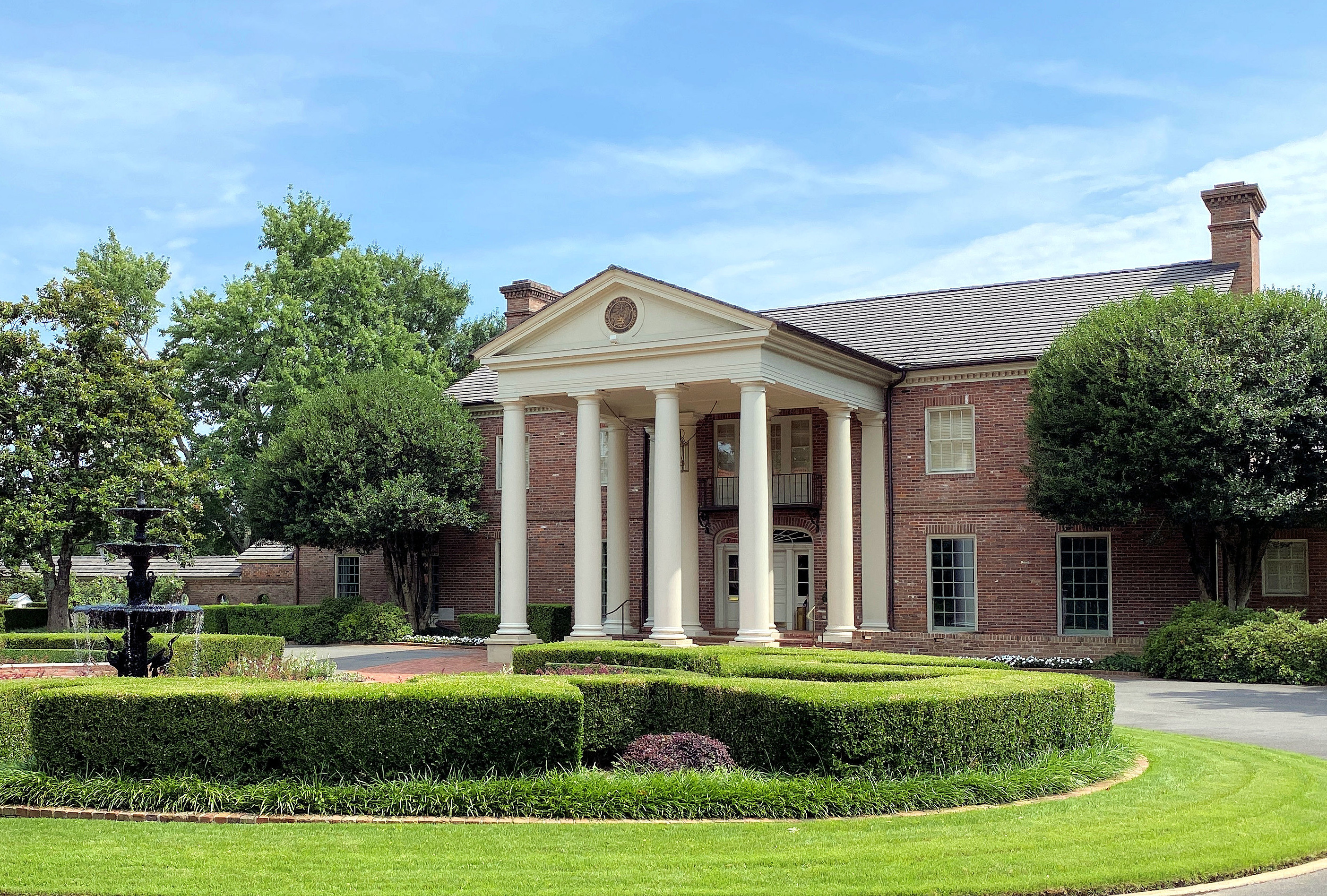

- Location within Arkansas Location within the United States
- Location: 1800 Center Street, Little Rock, Arkansas
- Coordinates: 34°43′54.83″N 92°16′33.57″W
- Architect: Frank J. Ginocchio, Jr. and Edwin B. Cromwell.
- Part of: Governor's Mansion Historic District (ID78000620)
- Added to NRHP: September 13, 1978

The Arkansas Governor's Mansion is the official residence of the governor of Arkansas and Arkansas' first family. The mansion is located at 1800 Center Street in Little Rock and is included in the Governor's Mansion Historic District, a district that is listed on the National Register of Historic Places. Notable former residents include later president Bill Clinton and politician turned TV presenter Mike Huckabee.

Until 1950, the State of Arkansas did not have an official residence for its governor.

== History ==
In 1947, Act 257 of the Arkansas General Assembly established a Governor's Mansion Commission with an appropriation of $100,000.00. The site was the former location of the Arkansas School for the Blind, which had moved to new quarters near the city's Pulaski Heights neighborhood. The architects were Frank J. Ginocchio, Jr. and Edwin B. Cromwell. Little Rock insurance and television executive Clyde E. Lowry led the effort to raise funds to build the mansion.

The architectural style of the mansion is Georgian Revival, colonial type. The main material of the exterior is brick. Construction began in December 1947 (incorporating 300,000 bricks from the original School for the Blind structures), and the Governor's Residence became operational officially on January 10, 1950. The first governor to reside here was Sidney S. McMath, who moved in on February 3, 1950. Significant additions to the mansion were completed during the administration of Mike Huckabee (1996-2007).

From 1986 to 1993, footage of the mansion was used for the television program Designing Women to represent the Atlanta home of character Suzanne Sugarbaker, played by Delta Burke, and in later seasons, the home of Anthony Bouvier, played by Meshach Taylor. In 2008, footage of the mansion was also used for the television program 30 Rock to represent the home of a character played by Steve Martin.

== See also ==
- List of governors' residences in the United States
- National Register of Historic Places listings in Little Rock, Arkansas
