= Governor's Mansion Historic District =

Historic district in Arkansas, United States

- U.S. National Register of Historic Places
- U.S. Historic district
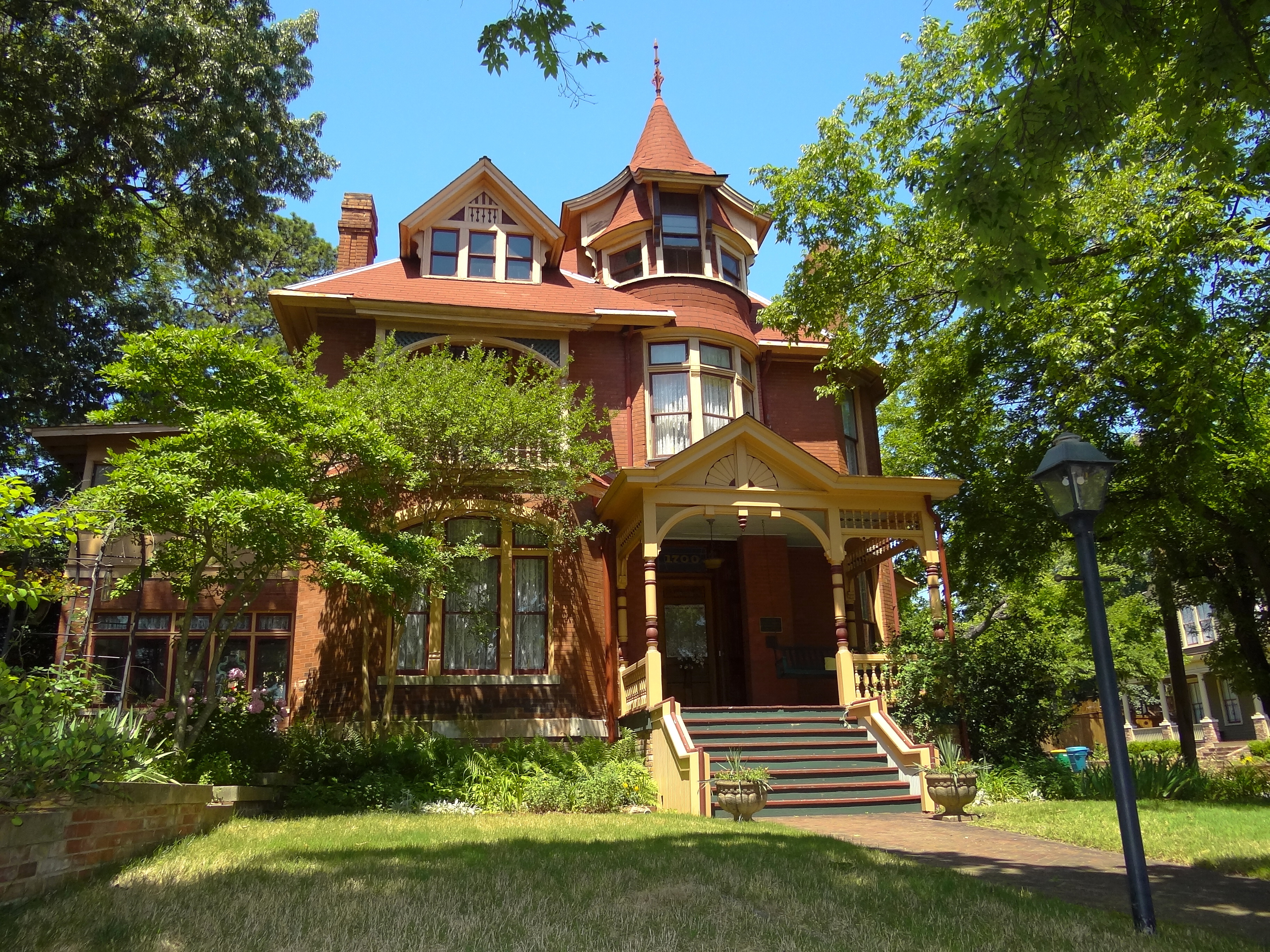
- Contributing property within the District

- Location within Arkansas Location within the United States
- Location: Bounded by the Mansion grounds, 13th, Center, Gaines, and 18th Sts. (original); roughly bounded by Louisiana St., Twenty-Third St. & Roosevelt Rd., Chester and State Sts., & Thirteenth & Twelfth Sts. (increase); Roughly along Louisiana Ave., from W. 23rd St. and 24th St. (increase II); Little Rock, Arkansas
- Coordinates: 34°44′2″N 92°16′39″W
- Area: 65 acres (26 ha), 224.5 acres (90.9 ha), and 4.8 acres (1.9 ha)
- Built: 1890
- Architect: Multiple
- Architectural style: Colonial Revival, Late Victorian, Bungalow/Craftsman (original); Queen Anne, Colonial Revival, et al. (increase II)
- NRHP reference No.: 78000620 (original); 88000631 (increase 1); 02000010 (increase 2); 100001943 (increase 3)

Significant dates
- Added to NRHP: September 13, 1978
- Boundary increases: May 19, 1988; February 15, 2002; May 9, 2018

The Governor's Mansion Historic District is a historic district covering a large historic neighborhood of Little Rock, Arkansas. It was listed on the National Register of Historic Places in 1978 and its borders were increased in 1988 and again in 2002. The district is notable for the large number of well-preserved late 19th and early 20th-century houses, and includes a major cross-section of residential architecture designed by the noted Little Rock architect Charles L. Thompson. It is the oldest city neighborhood to retain its residential character.

== Description and history ==
The district is located south of Little Rock's central business district, in an area that was, until 1869, a country estate. The area was heavily developed between 1880 and 1940. It includes a number of high quality Queen Anne Victorians, including the Hornibrook House, a particularly fine example of the style in brick. One of the city's finest examples of Colonial Revival architecture, the Hotze House, stands at 1619 S. Louisiana Street. The Craftsman style is the best represented of the period styles in the district, with more than 92 houses, most two-story brick structures built in a modest scale. The district includes five historically significant churches, out of ten within its bounds.

When the district was first listed in 1978, the district covered a 65-acre (26 ha) area bounded by the Arkansas Governor's Mansion grounds, 13th, Center, Gaines, and 18th Streets. However, there was concern over the scope of this listing, and the city later performed a detailed survey of a much larger area. This resulted in a significant expansion of the district in 1988, adding 224.5 acres (90.9 ha) and including 473 contributing buildings, roughly bounded by Louisiana St., Twenty-Third St. & Roosevelt Rd., Chester and State Sts., & Thirteenth & Twelfth Sts. It has since had smaller amendments and enlargements in 1993, 1996, 1999, and 2002. The 2002 increase added 12 contributing buildings in a 4.8-acre (1.9 ha) area located roughly along Louisiana Ave., from W. 23rd St. and 24th St.

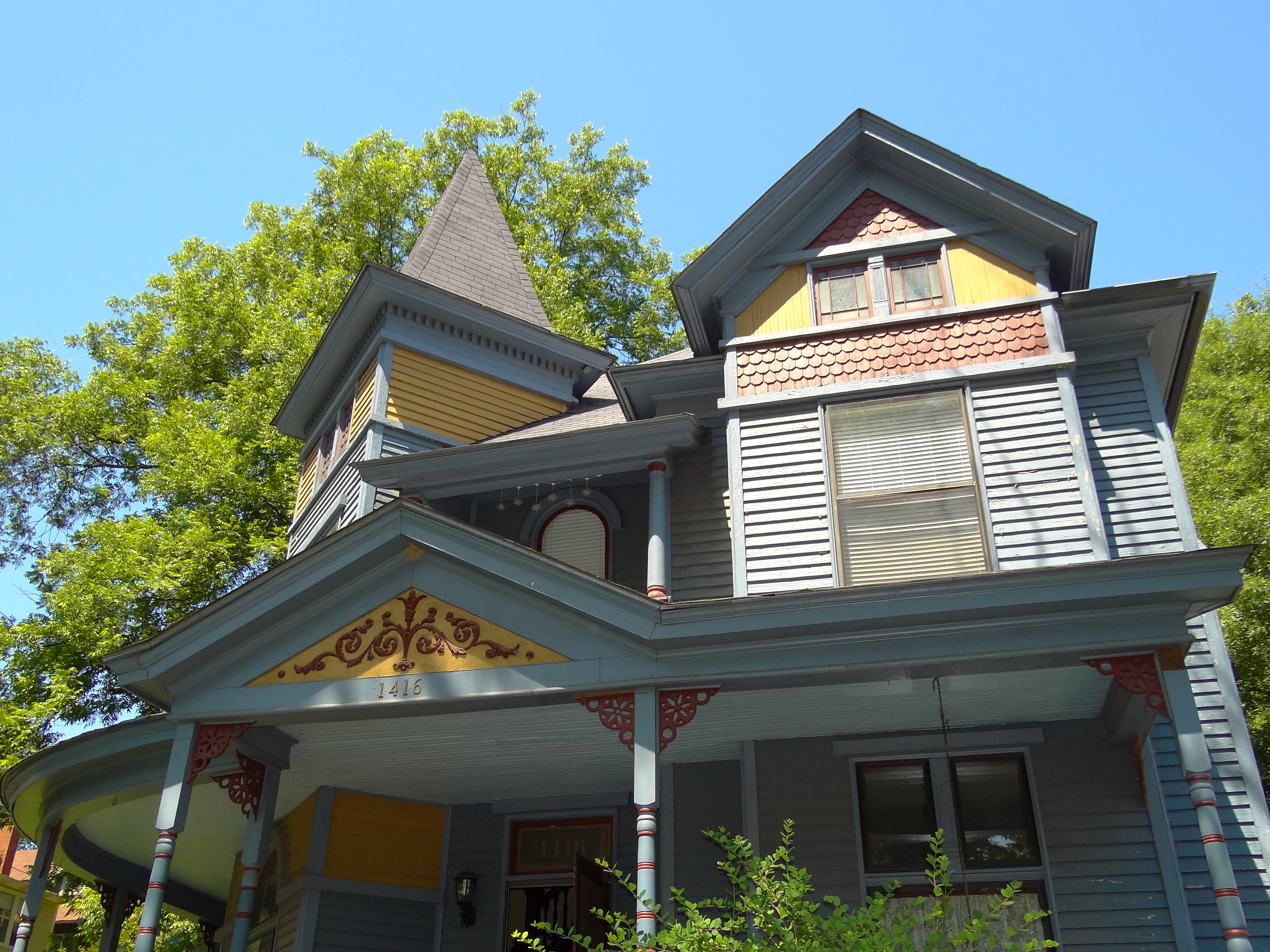
Building facade in historic district

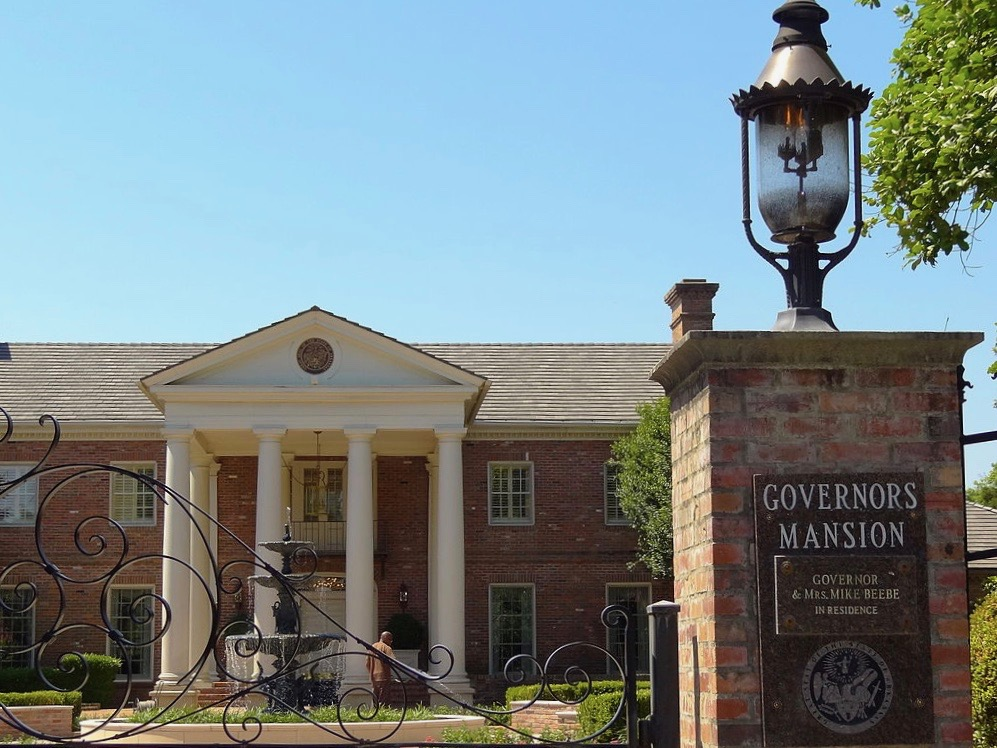
Outside the Gates of Governor's Mansion - Little Rock - Arkansas - USA

== See also ==
- National Register of Historic Places listings in Little Rock, Arkansas
