= Ambassador Bush =

Ambassador Bush may refer to:

- Dwight L. Bush Sr. (born 1957) U.S. Ambassador to Morocco (2014–2017)
- George H. W. Bush (1924–2018) U.S. Ambassador (1971–1975); to the United Nations (1971–1973); to the People's Republic of China (1974–1975)

== See also ==
- President Bush (disambiguation)
- Governor Bush (disambiguation)
- Bush (disambiguation)
