= Congressperson Bush =

Congressperson Bush or Congressman Bush or Congresswoman Bush may refer to:

== U.S. Senator ==
- Prescott Bush (1895–1972), U.S. senator (1952–1962)

== U.S. Representative ==
- Alvin Bush (1893–1959), served 1951–1959
- George H. W. Bush (1924–2018), served 1966–1970
- Cori Bush, serving since 2021

== State representative ==
- Diane Mitsch Bush (born 1950), member of the Colorado House of Representatives (2013-2017) and candidate for US House of Representatives (2018, 2020)
- James Drew Bush III (born 1955), member of the Florida House of Representatives (2008-2010)

== See also ==
- President Bush (disambiguation)
- Governor Bush (disambiguation)
- Bush (disambiguation)
