= Bush House (disambiguation) =

Bush House may refer to:

in Britain

- Bush House, Grade II listed building located in the Strand Campus of King's College London, London
- Bush House, Bristol, home to the Arnolfini Centre for the Contemporary Arts
- Bush House near Penicuik, home to the Edinburgh Centre for Rural Economy (ECRE)

in the United States

- Bush House (Grove Hill, Alabama), listed on the National Register of Historic Places (NRHP)
- Bush House (Little Rock, Arkansas), NRHP-listed
- Bush-Dubisson House, Little Rock, Arkansas, listed on the NRHP in Arkansas
- Bush-Holley House, Greenwich, Connecticut, NRHP-listed
- Bush-Usher House, Lumpkin, Georgia, listed on the NRHP in Georgia
- John D. Bush House, Exira, Iowa, listed on the NRHP in Iowa
- Capt. Robert V. Bush House, Becknerville, Kentucky, listed on the NRHP in Kentucky
- William Bush House, Elizabethtown, Kentucky, listed on the NRHP in Kentucky
- Bush-Dykes, W., House, Forest Grove, Kentucky, listed on the NRHP in Kentucky
- Cornelia Bush House, Louisville, Kentucky, listed on the NRHP in Kentucky
- S. S. Bush House, Louisville, Kentucky, listed on the NRHP in Kentucky
- John G. Bush House, Dover, Minnesota, listed on the NRHP in Minnesota
- Bush House (New Hebron, Mississippi), listed on the NRHP in Mississippi
- Horace and Grace Bush House, Penfield, New York, NRHP-listed
- Bush-Lyon Homestead, Port Chester, New York, NRHP-listed
- Samuel Bush House, Lancaster, Ohio, listed on the NRHP in Ohio
- Asahel Bush House, Salem, Oregon, NRHP-listed
- Bush House (Inman, South Carolina), NRHP-listed
- George W. Bush Childhood Home, Midland, Texas, NRHP-listed
