= USS Constitution vs HMS Guerriere =

Naval battle during the War of 1812

- Part of the War of 1812
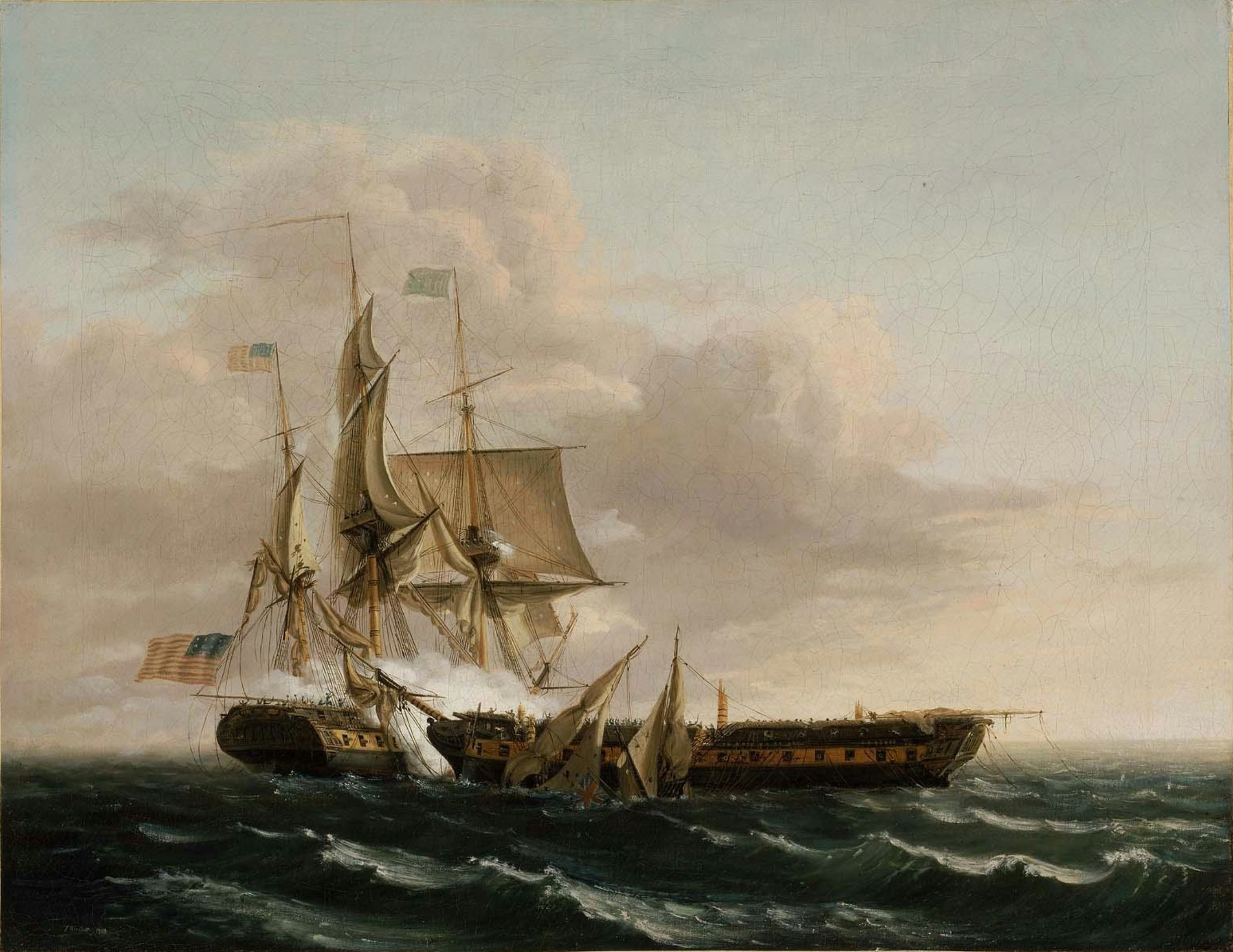
- USS Constitution vs HMS Guerriere by Thomas Birch
Date	19 August 1812
Location	Atlantic Ocean 41°42′N 55°33′W
Result	American victory

Belligerents
United States	(United Kingdom of Great Britain and Ireland) United Kingdom

Commanders and leaders
(United States Navy) Isaac Hull	(United Kingdom) James Richard Dacres (surrendered)

Units involved
USS Constitution	HMS Guerriere

Strength
44-gun Frigate; 56 guns 754lb broadside weight 480 U.S. Navy Sailors and U.S. Marine infantry	38-gun Frigate; 44 guns 526lb broadside weight 272 Royal Navy Sailors and Royal Marine infantry

Casualties and losses
7 killed 7 wounded	Guerriere sunk 15 killed 78 wounded 257 captured

USS Constitution vs HMS Guerriere was a battle between an American and British ship during the War of 1812, about 400 miles (640 km) southeast of Halifax, Nova Scotia. It took place on the 19th of August 1812, one month after the war's first engagement between British and American forces. Guerriere was proceeding to Halifax for a refit, having been detached from a squadron which had earlier failed to capture Constitution. The two ships encountered each other on August 19th. In the exchange of broadsides, Guerriere's masts were felled, and the ship reduced to a sinking condition. Constitution's crew took the British sailors on board and set Guerriere on fire, then returned to Boston with news of the victory, which proved to be important for American morale.

== Background ==
When the United States declared war on Britain on 18 June 1812, the Royal Navy had eighty-five vessels in American waters. By contrast, the United States Navy, which was not yet twenty years old, was a frigate navy that had only twenty-two commissioned vessels. The chief fighting strength of the U.S. Navy was a squadron of three frigates and two sloops of war under Commodore John Rodgers, based in New York. A week after Congress declared war, United States Secretary of the Navy Paul Hamilton had sent orders to Rodgers to cruise off New York, and to Captain Isaac Hull, commanding USS Constitution at Annapolis on Chesapeake Bay, to join Rodgers.

However, Rodgers set out to sea immediately when he heard of the declaration of war, before he could receive Hamilton's instructions. He feared that if he delayed he might be blockaded by a superior British fleet, but by sailing immediately he might catch isolated British ships before they could concentrate. He did indeed encounter the frigate HMS Belvidera, but Belvidera escaped, aided by a bursting cannon aboard USS President which injured Rodgers and caused much damage and confusion. Rodgers then crossed the Atlantic hoping to catch a valuable British convoy from the West Indies. The weather was foul throughout the voyage and Rodgers missed the convoy, capturing only seven small merchant vessels.

On hearing of Belvidera's encounter, Vice Admiral Herbert Sawyer, the commander of the Royal Navy's North American Station based at Halifax, Nova Scotia, despatched a squadron under Captain Philip Bowes Vere Broke to catch Rodgers' squadron. Broke's squadron consisted of the 64-gun ship of the line HMS Africa and the frigates Shannon, Aeolus, Belvidera and Guerriere. By forcing the British to concentrate their force in one place, Rodgers had made it possible for large numbers of American merchant ships to reach other ports without being intercepted.

=== Pursuit of USS Constitution ===
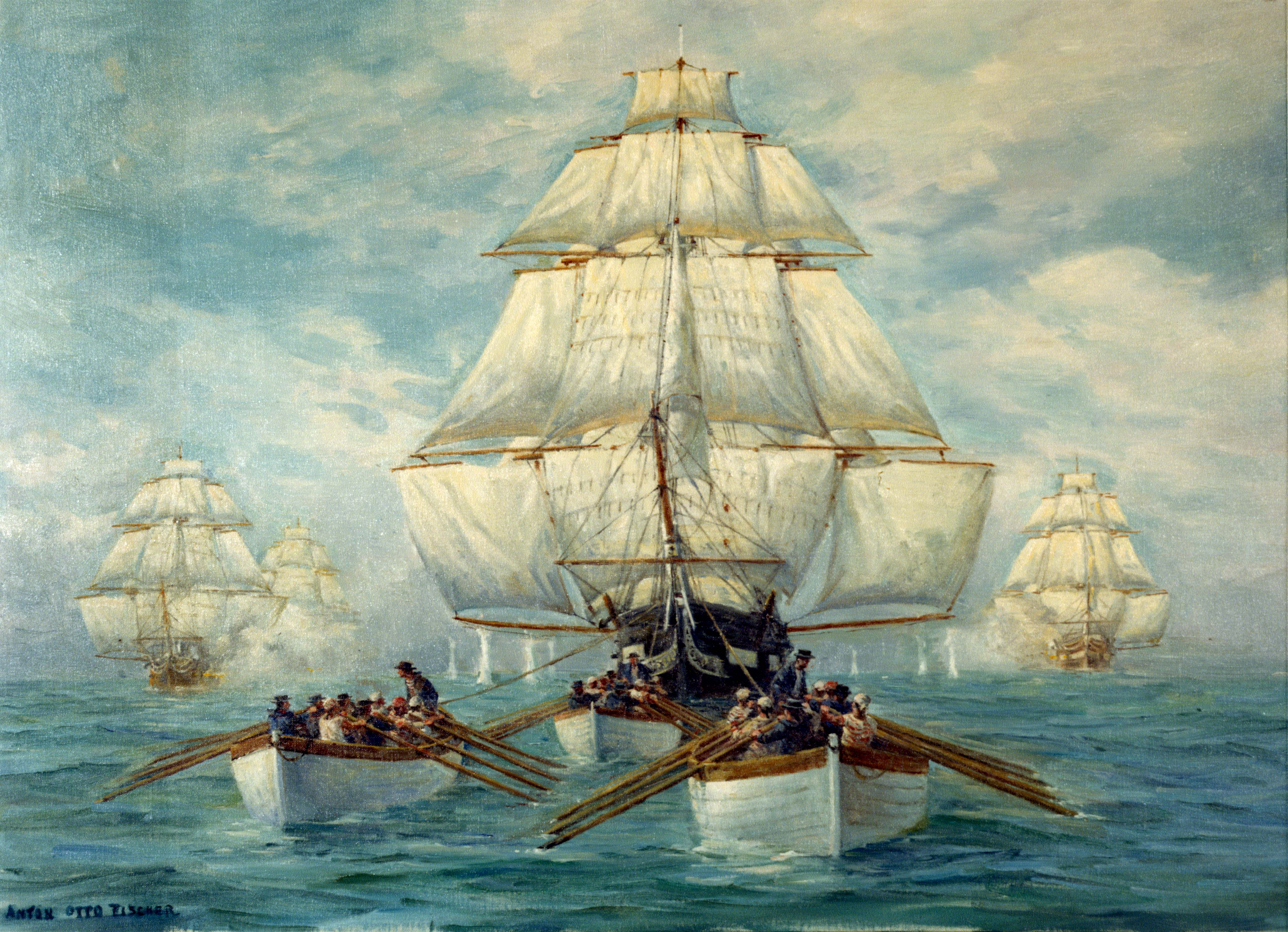
Constitution escapes the British squadron.

On the outbreak of war, Constitution was at Annapolis, collecting a fresh crew, and was unable to sail for three weeks. When her captain, Isaac Hull, was able to put his vessel to sea, he headed for New York in accordance with Secretary Hamilton's orders. Near New York, in the late afternoon of 17 July 1812, Hull saw four ships sailing west, and another one heading straight towards Constitution. He thought the ships could be his commander Rodgers' squadron, but was cautious. He ordered signal lights to be shown, and when the approaching ship did not identify herself, ordered Constitution to keep her distance and wait for daylight to assess the situation. The approaching ship was Guerriere, rejoining Broke's squadron after having become separated. Aboard her, Captain James Richard Dacres soon determined that Constitution was a hostile ship, but at dawn on 18 July, he sighted the other four British ships. His signals to them were not answered. Mistaking these ships for Rodgers' entire squadron, Dacres also put as much distance between Guerriere and the other ships as he could, thus missing a chance to trap Constitution.

In light and fitful winds which occasionally died away altogether, Constitution led the British squadron in a stern chase. Constitution lowered her boats to tow the ship, while Broke ordered the boats from the entire British squadron to tow Shannon. In an attempt to pull away, Hull ordered ten tons of drinking water to be pumped overboard. Despite this, the British squadron continued to gain on Constitution. Constitution's First Lieutenant, Charles Morris, then suggested kedging to haul the ship along. This allowed Constitution to draw away from Shannon. Fire from four heavy guns which Hull had shifted to point right aft prevented the British trying the same tactic. Late in the afternoon, the wind sprang up again, and Constitution increased her lead. The British ships gained slightly during the night, but the next day, Constitution drew away again, although the chase lasted another day and a night until the British ships were out of sight.

Following his escape, Hull sailed for Boston to replenish his drinking water supply, before setting out on 2 August to raid British merchant ships off Halifax and the mouth of the St. Lawrence River, and then sailing south again towards Bermuda. Constitution soon chased down the American privateer Decatur, and her captain told Hull that he had escaped a British frigate the day before.

Broke had meanwhile sailed after the valuable West India convoy, assuming correctly that Rodgers was also searching for it. Three weeks after losing sight of Constitution and having seen the convoy safely into British waters, Broke prepared to return to New York. Guerriere was detached and ordered to proceed to Halifax for a much-needed refit.

== Battle ==
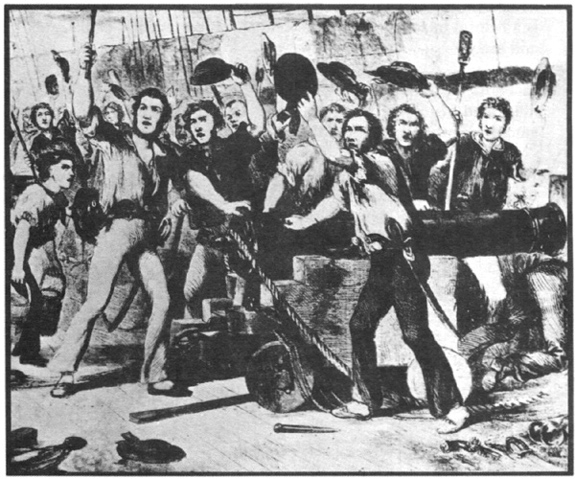
Gun crew on Constitution preparing to do battle with Guerriere

At 2:00 p.m. on 19 August, Constitution sighted a large ship to leeward, and bore down to investigate. The weather was cloudy, and the wind was brisk. The strange ship proved to be Guerriere, whose crew recognised Constitution at about the same moment. Both ships prepared for action, and shortened sail to "fighting sail", i.e. topsails and jibs only. As Constitution closed, Dacres first hove to to fire a broadside, which fell short, and then ran before the wind for three quarters of an hour with the Constitution on Guerriere's quarter. Dacres yawed several times to fire broadsides at Constitution, but Guerriere's broadsides were generally inaccurate, while the few shots fired from Constitution's foremost guns had little effect. After one cannonball bounced "harmlessly" off the side of Constitution, a crew member is said to have yelled "Huzzah! Her sides are made of iron!" Around the same time, Hull noted in the log that two British shots penetrated Constitution's hull, with the rest falling short or flying high into the rigging.

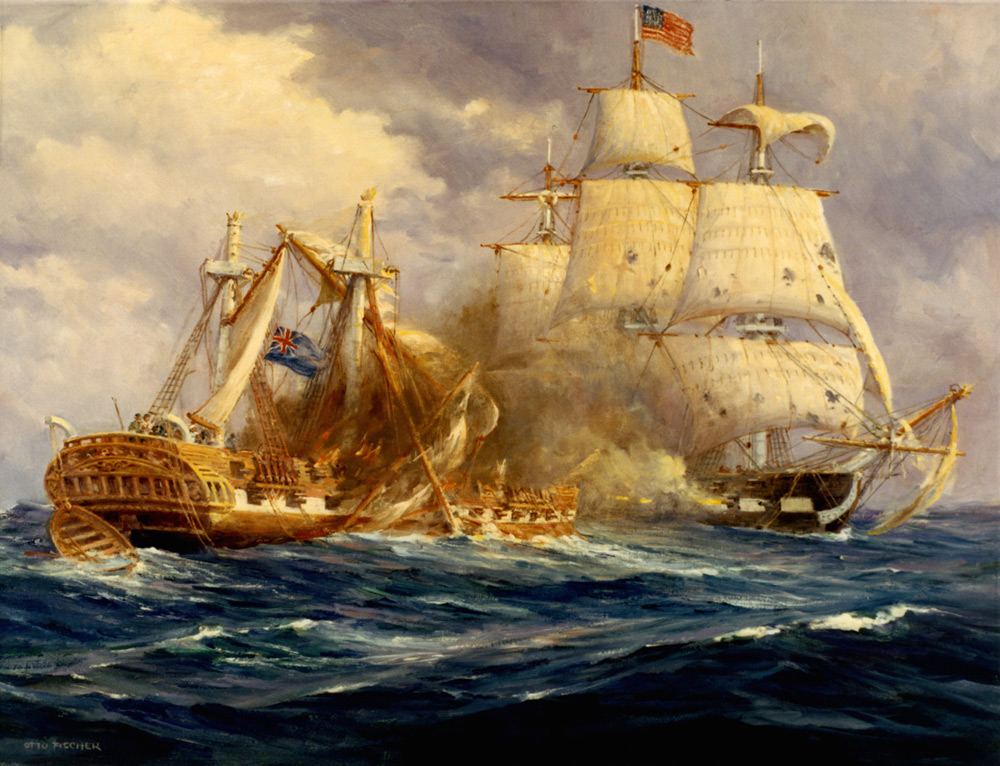
Constitution fires into the burning hulk of Guerriere, now badly damaged.

Once the range had closed to within a few hundred yards, Captain Hull ordered extra sail (the foresail and main topgallant sail) to be set, to close the distance quickly. Dacres did not match this maneuver, and the two ships began exchanging broadsides at "half pistol-shot", with Constitution to starboard and Guerriere to port. After fifteen minutes of this exchange, during which Guerriere suffered far more damage than Constitution due to the latter's greater firepower and accuracy, Guerriere's mizzenmast fell overboard to starboard, acting like a rudder and dragging her around. This allowed Constitution to cross ahead of Guerriere, firing a raking broadside which brought down the main yard. Hull then wore ship to cross Guerriere's bow again, firing another raking broadside, but the maneuver was cut too close and Guerriere's bowsprit became entangled in the rigging of Constitution's mizzenmast.

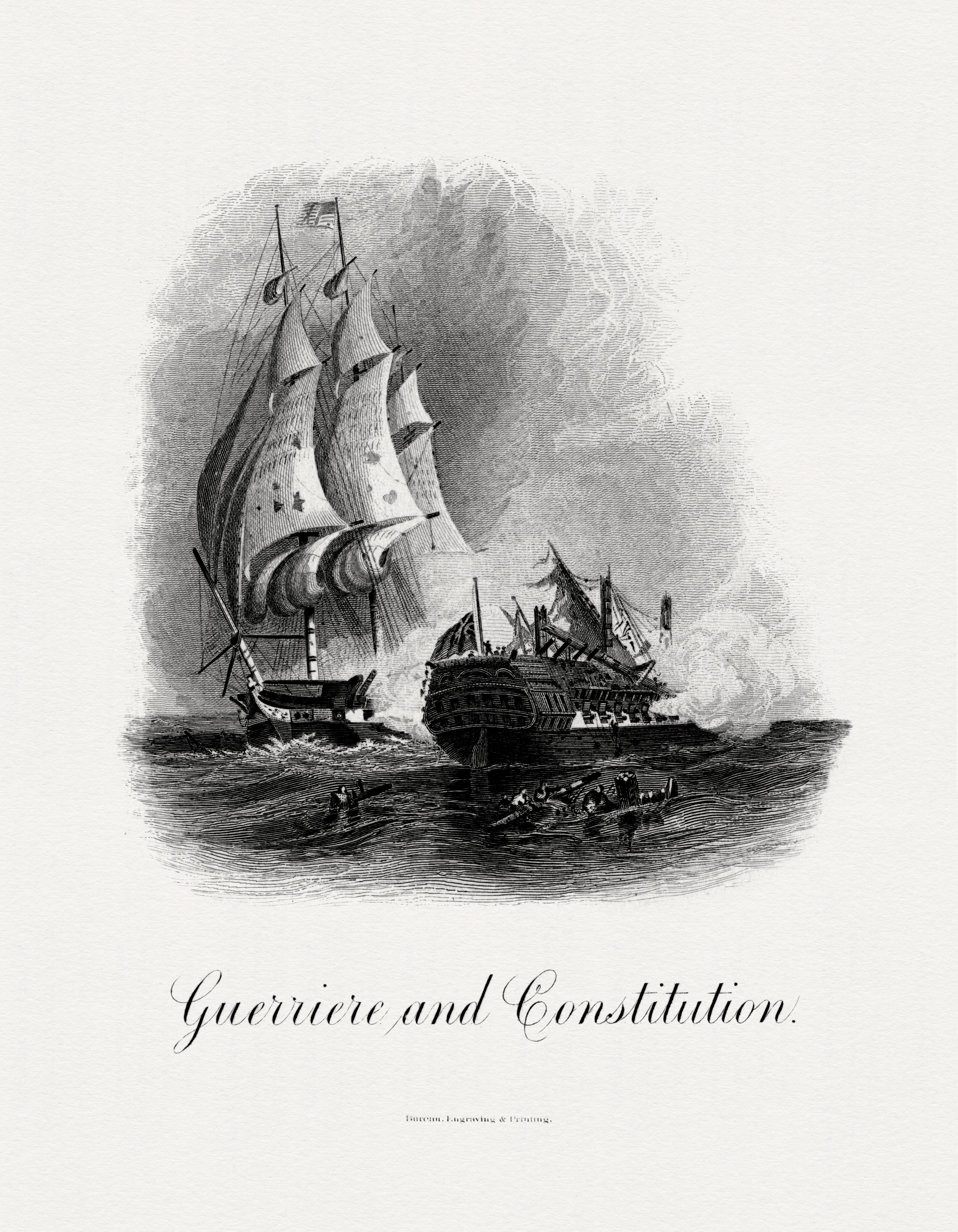
Guerriere and Constitution, a BEP engraving.

On both ships, boarding parties were summoned and musket fire broke out. Aboard Constitution, Lieutenant William S. Bush was killed and Lieutenant Charles Morris wounded by musket shots, as was Captain Dacres. Only Guerriere's narrow bowsprit provided a way between the ships, and in the heavy sea, neither side could venture across it. Some of the gunners aboard Guerriere fired at point-blank range into Hull's stern cabin, setting the American ship on fire briefly. The two locked ships slowly rotated clockwise until they broke free. Guerriere's foremast and mainmast both then fell "by the board" i.e. snapped off at deck level, leaving her helpless and rolling heavily. Dacres attempted to set sail on the bowsprit to bring his ship before the wind, but it too had been damaged and broke. The Constitution meanwhile ran downwind for several minutes, repairing damage to the rigging, before once again wearing and beating upwind to return to battle.

As Constitution prepared to renew the action, Guerriere fired a shot in the opposite direction to Constitution. Sensing that this was an attempt to signal surrender, Hull ordered a boat to take a lieutenant over to the British ship. When the lieutenant boarded Guerriere and asked if Guerriere was prepared to surrender, Captain Dacres responded "Well, Sir, I don't know. Our mizzen mast is gone, our fore and main masts are gone - I think on the whole you might say we have struck our flag."

== Aftermath ==
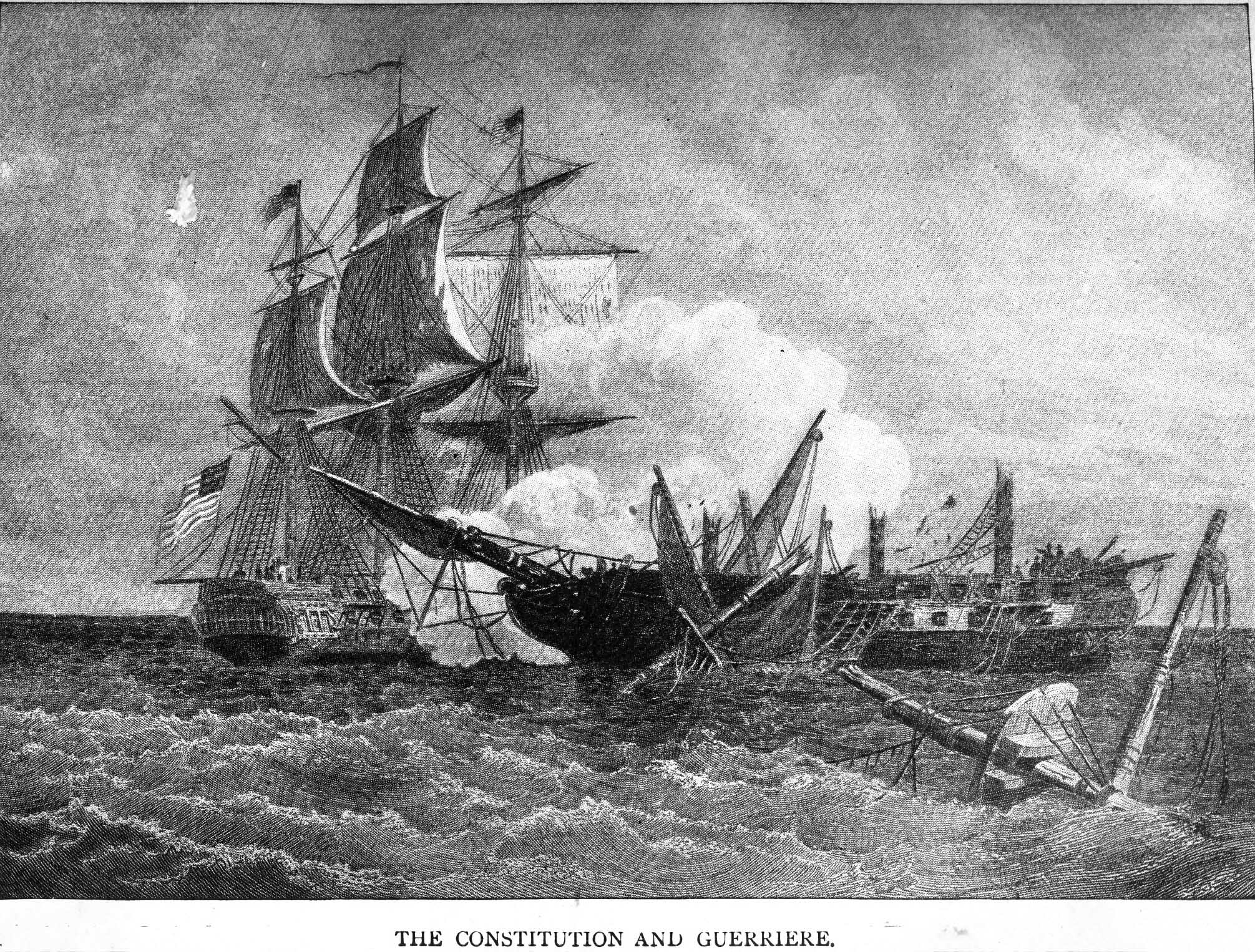
Constitution after the defeat of Guerriere.

Captain Dacres was escorted aboard Constitution. Hull refused to accept Dacres' sword of surrender, saying he could not accept the sword from a man who had fought so gallantly. He also ordered that Dacres' mother's Bible be returned to him. Guerriere was clearly sinking, and the wounded were transferred to Constitution. Hull found that ten impressed Americans had been serving aboard Guerriere but Dacres had permitted them to stay below decks instead of fighting their countrymen.

Hull wanted Guerriere towed in as a prize ship. Constitution lay by Guerriere during the night but at daybreak it was obvious that Guerriere could not be salvaged. The prisoners and the American salvage parties were brought aboard Constitution and at 3:00 p.m., Guerriere was set on fire, and soon blew up.

Although Constitution was substantially undamaged and still had two thirds of her ammunition, shot from the Guerriere was wedged in the lower masts of the frigate and Constitution was unable to continue her cruise. Furthermore, Hull wanted the American public to have news of the victory. He reached Boston ten days later, and his news (with the obvious proof of more than two hundred prisoners of war) caused rejoicing. Guerriere had been one of the most active ships of the Royal Navy in stopping and searching American merchant vessels, and the news of her defeat was particularly satisfying to the American seafaring community.

After his return, Hull was never to hold another fighting command. His brother had died, leaving a widow and children whom Hull was now duty-bound to support. Seeking a commission that would better accommodate his new domestic responsibilities, Hull asked Navy Secretary Hamilton if he could exchange commands with Captain William Bainbridge, under whom he had served during the Barbary Wars and who was then commander of the Boston Navy Yard. Hamilton agreed, and on 15 September 1812, Hull took over the Navy Yard and Bainbridge became captain of Constitution.

For his bravery during the battle, Lieutenant John Cushing Aylwin was commended after gallantly facing the enemy and refusing medical attention until each of his men had been properly treated. However, Aylwin succumbed to injuries received during the Constitution's single-ship action against HMS Java on 29 December 1812.

Once released by exchange of prisoners and returned to Halifax, Captain Dacres was tried by court martial, as was customary in the case of a Royal Navy ship lost from any cause. He put forward in his defence the material state of Guerriere. The frigate was originally French-built, captured by the Royal Navy in 1806, and therefore not as sturdy as British-built ships. Also, Guerriere was badly decayed and proceeding to Halifax to refit at the time, and the fall of the mizzen mast which hampered Guerriere early in the fight was claimed to be due as much to rot as battle damage. There was no suggestion that Dacres and his men had not done their utmost, or that Dacres had been reckless to engage Constitution. Dacres was therefore acquitted.

Two months after the battle between Constitution and Guerriere, the frigate HMS Macedonian was captured by the USS United States. Although Macedonian suffered the same proportion of casualties as Guerriere had and was incapable of further resistance, she was soon repaired while at sea, and was sailed back to the United States, giving some credibility to Dacres' statements in his defence.

Before the run of American victories in single-ship encounters early in the War of 1812, it was believed in the Royal Navy that a British 38-gun frigate could successfully engage a 44-gun frigate of any other nation. Before the battle, Dacres had appeared to be confident that, whatever its material state, his ship could defeat any American frigate. On 10 August, Dacres had captured an American merchant brig, Betsey. The brig's master (William B. Orne) was a prisoner aboard Guerriere when Constitution was sighted and later wrote:

...the conclusion of course was, that she was either a French or an American frigate. Captain Dacres appeared anxious to ascertain her character, and after looking at her for that purpose, handed me his spy-glass, requesting me to give him my opinion of the stranger. I soon saw from the peculiarity of her sails, and from her general appearance, that she was, without doubt, an American frigate, and communicated the same to Captain Dacres. He immediately replied, that he thought she came down too boldly for an American, but soon after added : 'The better he behaves, the more honor we shall gain by taking him.'

Dacres is also supposed to have remarked to Orne that he would "be made for life" as the first British captain to capture an American frigate.

== Significance ==
Although the battle was, arguably, inconsequential from a military perspective, as the loss of Guerriere was insignificant to the 600 ship Royal Navy, it was a pivotal moment in American naval history.

The effect of the battle on American morale and patriotism was immeasurable. Prior to the battle, the American land campaign against Canada had been unsuccessful with a resulting loss of public support for the war. After the battle, the American public became galvanized by the pride in defeating the vaunted Royal Navy in a "fair" fight. Although Constitution and Guerriere were both frigates, Constitution carried more guns of larger calibers, was built with stronger structural elements (scantling), and had a larger crew and, therefore, had a decisive advantage.

Comparison of combatant vessels (Note: English measurement methods used for both ships)
	HMS Guerriere	USS Constitution
Length (gundeck)	154 ft 6 in (47.09 m)	175 ft 0 in (53.34 m)
Beam	39 ft 4 in (11.99 m)	43 ft 6 in (13.26 m)
Tonnage	1092 tons	1576 tons
Complement	272 men	480 men
Armament	28 × 18-pounder long guns 16 × 32-pounder carronades 2 × 12-pounder chase guns 1 × 18-pounder boat carronade	30 × 24-pounder long guns 20 × 32-pounder carronades 2 × 24-pounder chase guns
Broadside weight	528 lbs	754 lbs
