= USS Bush =

Two ships of the United States Navy have been named Bush, in honor of William Sharp Bush.

- USS Bush (DD-166), a Wickes-class destroyer, which served from 1919 until 1922.
- USS Bush (DD-529), was a Fletcher-class destroyer, which served from 1943 until she was sunk off Okinawa, 6 April 1945.

== See also ==
- USS George H.W. Bush
