= Bush School =

Bush School may refer to:

- Bush School (Washington), a K-12 school in Seattle, Washington, named after Helen Taylor Bush.
- Bush School of Government and Public Service, a graduate college of Texas A&M University, named after George H.W. Bush
- George Bush High School, Fort Bend County, Texas, USA
- a school for survival training

== See also ==
- Bush (disambiguation)
