= Presidency of George Bush =

Presidency of George Bush may refer to:

- Presidency of George H. W. Bush, the United States presidential administration from 1989 to 1993
- Presidency of George W. Bush, the United States presidential administration from 2001 to 2009

== See also ==
- President Bush (disambiguation)
- George Bush (disambiguation)
- Bush (disambiguation)
