= List of federal judges appointed by George Bush =

List of federal judges appointed by George Bush may refer to:

- List of federal judges appointed by George H. W. Bush, appointments by George H. W. Bush, the 41st president of the United States
- List of federal judges appointed by George W. Bush, appointments by George W. Bush, the 43rd president of the United States

== See also ==
- George Bush (disambiguation)
