= George Bush judicial appointment controversies =

George Bush judicial appointment controversies may refer to:

- George H. W. Bush judicial appointment controversies, with nominations made by George H. W. Bush, the 41st president of the United States
- George W. Bush judicial appointment controversies, with nominations made by George W. Bush, the 43rd president of the United States

== See also ==
- George Bush (disambiguation)
