= George Brush =

George Brush may refer to:

- George de Forest Brush (1855–1941), American painter
- George Jarvis Brush (1831–1912), American mineralogist
- George W. Brush (1842–1927), American soldier, physician and politician

== See also ==
- George Bush (disambiguation)
