= Bush-Dubisson House =

Historic house in Arkansas, United States

- Bush--Dubisson House
- U.S. National Register of Historic Places
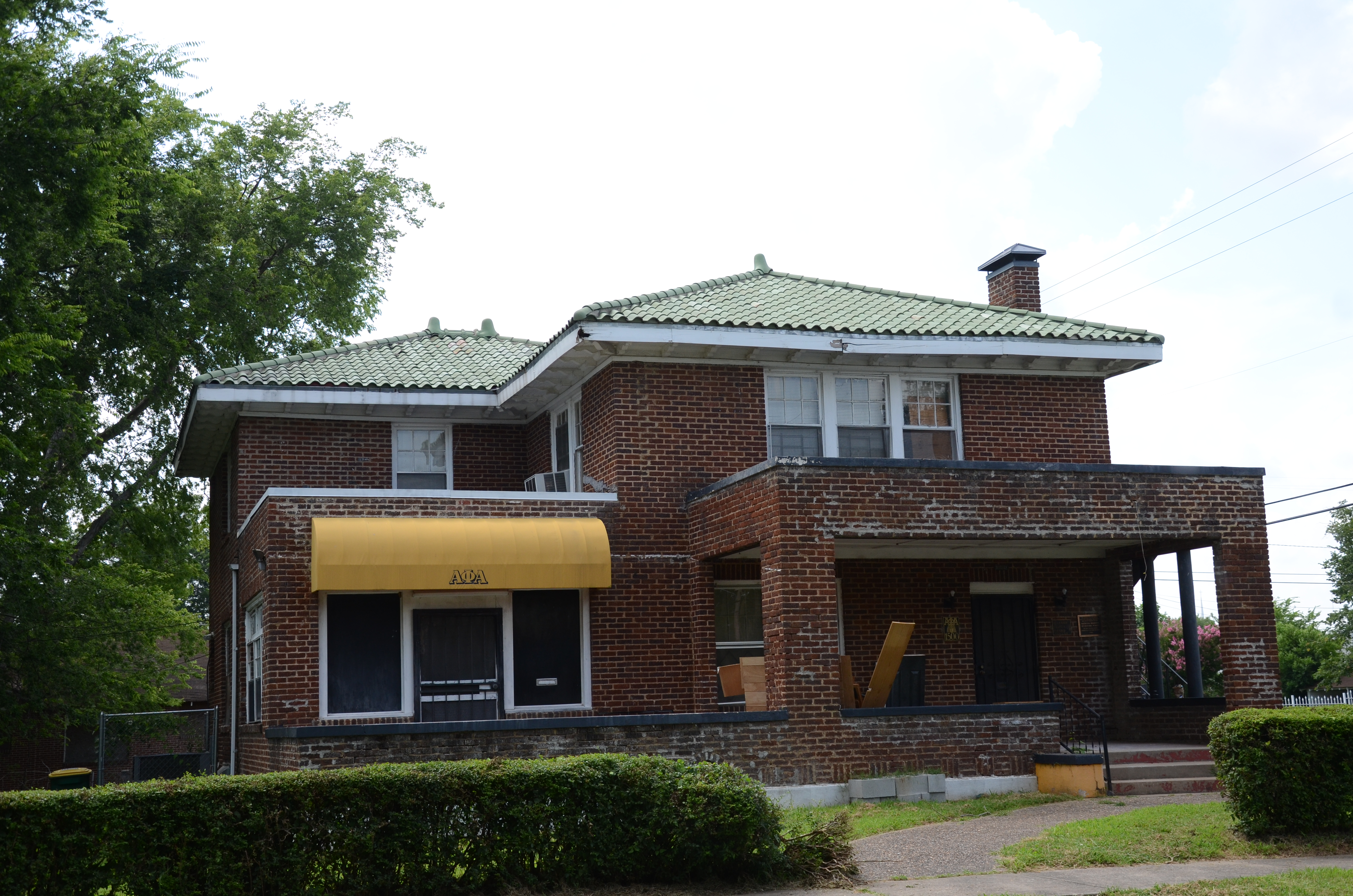

- Location within Arkansas Location within the United States
- Location: 1500 S. Ringo St., Little Rock, Arkansas
- Coordinates: 34°44′8″N 92°17′1″W
- Area: less than one acre
- Built: 1925
- Built by: S.E. Wiggins
- Architectural style: Prairie School
- MPS: Historically Black Properties in Little Rock's Dunbar School Neighborhood MPS
- NRHP reference No.: 99000549
- Added to NRHP: May 28, 1999

The Bush-Dubisson House is a historic house at 1500 South Ringo Street in Little Rock, Arkansas. It is a two-story masonry structure, built out of red brick with a tile roof. It has classical Prairie School features, including a broad hip roof with extended eaves, a single-story porch, part of which is open and part is topped by a balcony supported by large brick piers. It was built in 1925 for Aldridge Bush, a prominent local African-American businessman, and was owned for many years by another, Daniel J. Dubisson. It was constructed by S.E. Wiggin, a local African-American contractor.

The house was listed on the National Register of Historic Places in 1999. A previous house built for Bush to a design by Charles L. Thompson, is also listed on the National Register as the Bush House; it stands at 1516 South Ringo.

== See also ==
- National Register of Historic Places listings in Little Rock, Arkansas
