= Governor Bush =

Governor Bush may refer to:

- George W. Bush (born 1946), 46th Governor of Texas (1995–2000) and 43rd President of the United States. (2001-2009)
- Jeb Bush (born 1953), 43rd Governor of Florida (1999–2007) and younger brother of George W. Bush

== See also ==
- Grattan Bushe, Governor of Barbados from 1941 to 1946
- Bush (disambiguation)
- President Bush (disambiguation)
