= Büsching =

Büsching may refer to:

- Anton Friedrich Büsching (1724–1793), German geographer, historian, educator and theologian
- Johann Gustav Gottlieb Büsching (1783–1829), German antiquary
- Büsching (crater), a lunar impact crater

== See also ==
- Bushing (disambiguation)
