= USS Bush (DD-529) =

Fletcher-class destroyer

Coordinates: 27°16′N 127°48′E

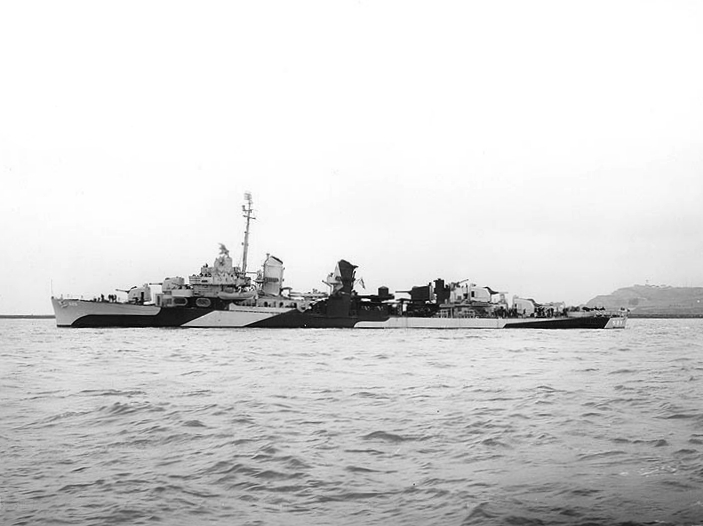
- USS Bush (DD-529) off Mare Island, 11 June 1944 with camouflage Measure 32.

History

United States
- Name: Bush
- Namesake: William Sharp Bush
- Builder: Bethlehem Shipbuilding Corporation, San Francisco, California
- Laid down: 12 February 1942
- Launched: 27 October 1942
- Commissioned: 10 May 1943
- Fate: Sunk by kamikazes off Okinawa, 6 April 1945

General characteristics
- Class & type: Fletcher-class destroyer
- Displacement: 2,050 tons
- Length: 376 ft 6 in (114.7 m)
- Beam: 39 ft 8 in (12.1 m)
- Draft: 17 ft 9 in (5.4 m)
- Propulsion: 60,000 shp (45 MW); 2 propellers
- Speed: 35 knots (65 km/h; 40 mph)
- Range: 6500 nmi. (12,000 km) at 15 kt
- Complement: 336
- Armament: 5 × single Mk 12 5 in (127 mm)/38 guns; 5 × twin 40 mm (1.6 in) Bofors AA guns; 7 × single 20 mm (0.8 in) Oerlikon AA guns; 2 × quintuple 21 in (533 mm) torpedo tubes; 6 × single depth charge throwers; 2 × depth charge racks

USS Bush (DD-529), a Fletcher-class destroyer, was the second ship of the United States Navy to be named for Lieutenant William Sharp Bush, USMC, who served on the Constitution during the War of 1812.

Bush was launched 27 October 1942 by Bethlehem Steel Co., San Francisco, Calif., sponsored by Miss Marion Jackson, great-great-grandniece of Lieutenant Bush; and commissioned 10 May 1943.

== Service history ==
Between 29 July and 27 November 1943 Bush acted as a patrol and escort vessel in Alaskan waters. Arriving at Pearl Harbor 4 December 1943, she commenced operations as a patrol, escort, and fire support ship throughout the Pacific, from the Ellice Islands to New Guinea, the Philippines, and Okinawa. She participated in the Bismarck Archipelago operations, including the Cape Gloucester, New Britain landings and the Admiralty Islands landings (26 December 1943 – 31 March 1944); Saidor, New Guinea, operations (18–21 January); Morotai landings (15 September); Leyte landings (20–24 October), Luzon operation, including the Mindoro and Lingayen Gulf landings (12–18 December 1944 and 4–18 January 1945); Iwo Jima operation (19 February–9 March); (in which She'd been tasked with escorting the USS Nashville, which had been carrying General Douglas MacArthur) and the Okinawa operation (1–6 April).

On 1 November 1944, while operating in Leyte Gulf and during hours of continuous combat operations, Bush shot down two of ten Japanese planes during a severe air attack. She was showered by flying shrapnel and suffered two men wounded, one of whom was its executive officer, Lt. P.A. "Tony" Lilly. "The destroyer Bush, on antisubmarine patrol in South Surigao Strait, fought a running battle with numerous planes all morning, beginning at 9:40 a.m., when she opened up on a Betty that came in on the ship’s starboard beam, dropped a torpedo, and swept off. Bush maneuvered to avoid the torpedo and hit the plane with her forty-millimeter guns. Four minutes later another Betty rushed the destroyer, and Bush, zigzagging furiously, dodged another torpedo and brought the plane down close to her side. A third, fourth, fifth, and sixth Betty pounced on the destroyer, as though she were the only ship on the high seas, the tail gunner of one plane strafing with his machine gun."

Bush was operating as radar picket ship off Okinawa 6 April 1945 and had splashed at least one plane when she was hit and subsequently sunk by three Japanese kamikazes. At 1515, the first plane hit at the deck level on the starboard side between number one and two stacks causing its bomb or torpedo to explode in the forward engine room. Although much damage was sustained the ship was not believed to be in severe danger and tugs were requested. Colhoun was closing in to assist when she received the first of four hits by suicide planes and was so severely damaged that she had to be sunk by United States forces.

At 1725, a second kamikaze crashed into the port side of Bush's main deck between the stacks, starting a large fire and nearly severing the ship. At 1745, a third crashed onto the port side just above the main deck. Some of the ship's ammunition caught fire and began to explode. Although it was believed that she would break amidships, it was thought that both halves would be salvageable. However, an unusually heavy swell rocked the ship, and Bush began to cave in amidships. Other swells followed, and the ship was abandoned by her 227 survivors just before she folded and sank. 87 of her crew were lost.

== Awards ==
Bush received seven battle stars for her World War II service.
