= William Bush House =

Historic house in Kentucky, United States

- U.S. National Register of Historic Places
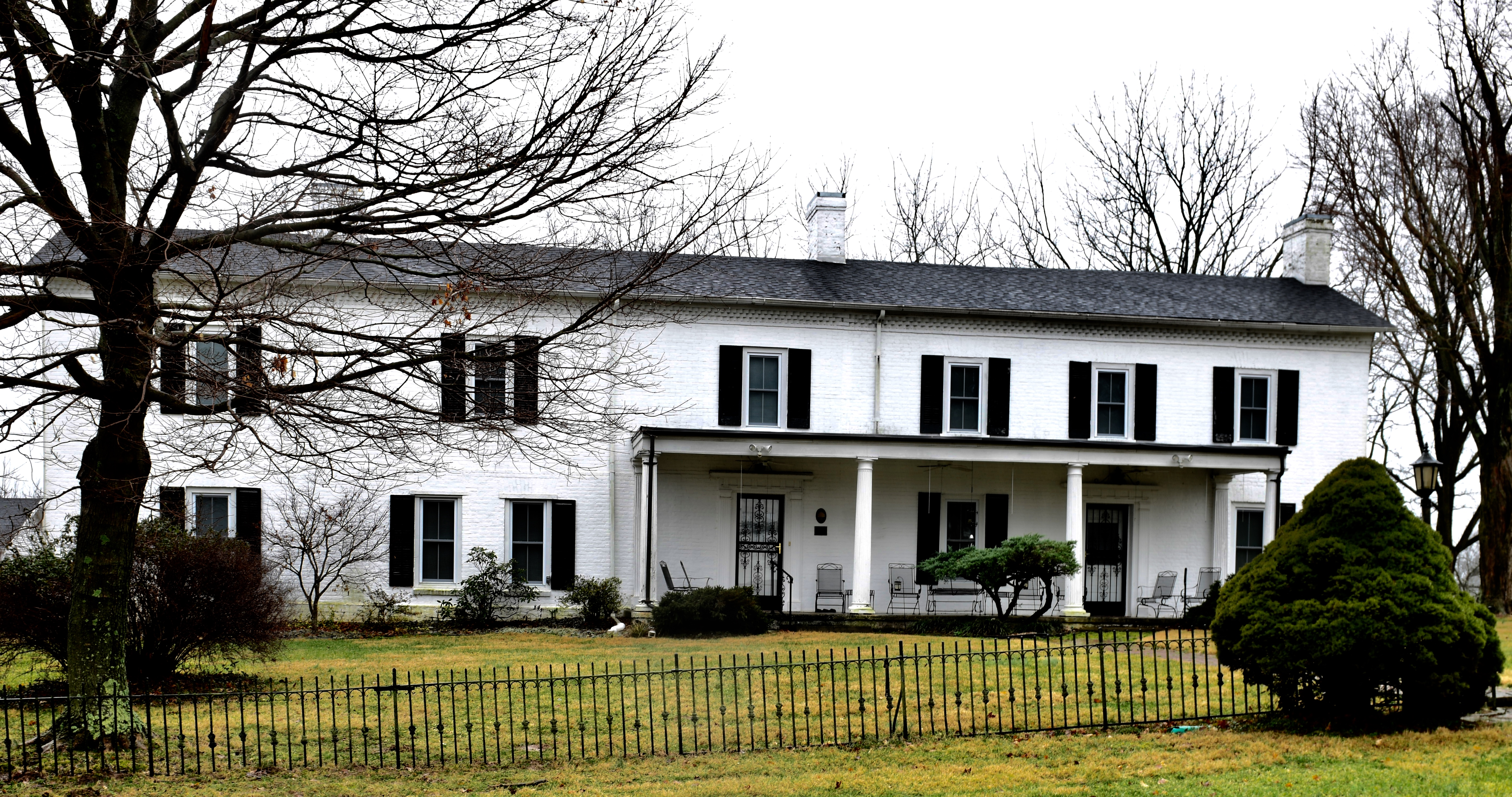

- Location within Kentucky Location within the United States
- Location: 1927 Tunnel Hill Rd. Elizabethtown, Kentucky
- Coordinates: 37°43′43″N 85°50′05″W
- Area: 3.2 acres (1.3 ha)
- Built: 1817
- Architectural style: Federal
- MPS: Hardin County MRA
- NRHP reference No.: 88001807
- Added to NRHP: October 4, 1988

The William Bush House, at 1927 Tunnel Hill Rd. in Elizabethtown, Kentucky, is a historic house built in 1817. It was listed on the National Register of Historic Places in 1988.

== Overview ==
It is a two-story Federal style house built in stages. In 1817 a brick three-bay two-story central passage plan house was built. During the 1820s and 1830s lateral additions resulted in a seven-bay two-story house, with the additions including matching brick corbelling at the cornice and other matching details. A porch with Doric columns was added c.1910.

== Recognition ==
It was deemed "a notable example of an early 19th century brick residence" and is one of the oldest homes in the city limits of Elizabethtown. It is also notable for ties to early settler William Bush. William Bush was the son of Christopher Bush, an early settler who moved to Hardin County in the 1780s. William Bush amassed a large farm in the early 1800s and in 1817 he had the original three bay brick section of this home constructed which is one of the oldest within the city limits of Elizabethtown. Bush's sister, Sara Bush Johnston, married Thomas Lincoln in 1819 and became Abraham Lincoln's stepmother.

The house is noteworthy for its unusual lateral addition plan of the early 19th century. The house was enlarged in the 1820s and 1830s by the construction of matching two-story brick additions. These additions were carefully constructed with corbelled brick at the cornice and windows and door openings to match those on the original structure. This type of lateral addition is unusual in the county with most additions of this period occurring at the rear of structures. Since the early 1800s modern additions have been confined to the rear of the house and it displays its original 19th century character.

== See also ==
- John C. Brown House
