= George Bush (footballer) =

English footballer

Personal information
- Full name: George Edward Bush
- Date of birth: 1883
- Place of birth: Canning Town, England
- Date of death: 1936 (aged 52–53)
- Position: Winger

Senior career*
Years	Team	Apps	(Gls)
1906–1908	Leyton		
1908	Grimsby Town	12	(2)
- * Club domestic league appearances and goals

George Edward Bush (1883 – 1936) was an English professional footballer who played as a winger.
