= Frigate navy =

Navy of mostly frigates

Frigate navy is a term describing a nation state's navy that is made of mostly frigates or destroyers as a major combat force. This navy would thus be lacking large vessels such as cruisers, a significant number of effective submarines, or aircraft carriers, but it would also be more effective and deployable than a navy that just maintains corvettes or gunboats. An example of a "gunboat navy" was the United States Navy in the administration of Thomas Jefferson (1801-1809), who wanted to avoid getting involved in the Anglo-French wars by creating a frigate navy.

A frigate navy can be a green water navy or a brown water navy, depending on how logistics are structured. The Royal Netherlands Navy is an example of a frigate navy, as was the U.S. Navy in the War of 1812.
