= President Bush =

President Bush may refer to:

- George H. W. Bush (1924–2018), president of the United States from 1989 to 1993 and father of George W. Bush
- George W. Bush (born 1946), president of the United States from 2001 to 2009 and first son of George H. W. Bush

== See also ==
- Presidency of George Bush (disambiguation)
- George Bush (disambiguation)
- Bush (disambiguation)
- Jeb Bush 2016 presidential campaign
