= USS Bush (DD-166) =

Wickes-class destroyer

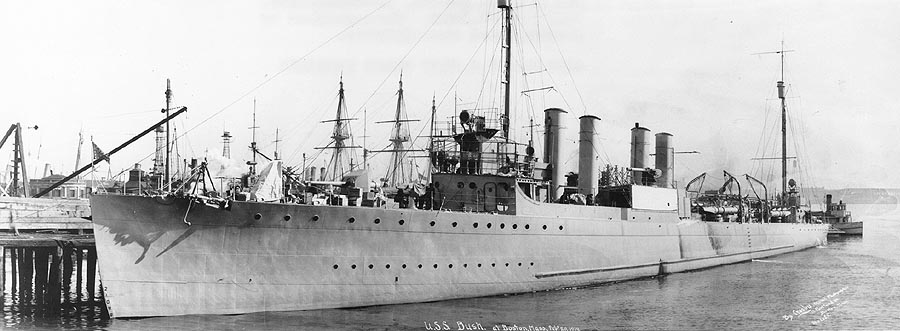
- USS Bush (DD-166)

History

United States
- Namesake: William Sharp Bush
- Builder: Fore River Shipyard, Quincy, Massachusetts
- Laid down: 4 July 1918
- Launched: 27 October 1918
- Commissioned: 19 February 1919
- Decommissioned: 21 June 1922
- Stricken: 7 January 1936
- Fate: Sold for scrapping, 8 September 1936

General characteristics
- Class & type: Wickes-class destroyer
- Displacement: 1,202–1,208 long tons (1,221–1,227 t) (standard); 1,295–1,322 long tons (1,316–1,343 t) (deep load)
- Length: 314 ft 4 in (95.8 m)
- Beam: 30 ft 11 in (9.42 m)
- Draught: 9 ft 10 in (3.0 m)
- Installed power: 27,000 shp (20,000 kW); 4 water-tube boilers
- Propulsion: 2 shafts, 2 steam turbines
- Speed: 35 knots (65 km/h; 40 mph) (design)
- Range: 2,500 nautical miles (4,600 km; 2,900 mi) at 20 knots (37 km/h; 23 mph) (design)
- Complement: 6 officers, 108 enlisted men
- Armament: 4 × single 4-inch (102 mm) guns; 2 × single 1-pounder AA guns; 4 × triple 21 inch (533 mm) torpedo tubes; 2 × depth charge rails

USS Bush (DD-166) was a Wickes-class destroyer built for the United States Navy during World War I.

== Description ==
The Wickes class was an improved and faster version of the preceding Caldwell-class. Two different designs were prepared to the same specification that mainly differed in the turbines and boilers used. The ships built to the Bethlehem Steel design, built in the Fore River and Union Iron Works shipyards, mostly used Yarrow boilers that deteriorated badly during service and were mostly scrapped during the 1930s. The ships displaced 1,202–1,208 long tons (1,221–1,227 t) at standard load and 1,295–1,322 long tons (1,316–1,343 t) at deep load. They had an overall length of 314 feet 4 inches (95.8 m), a beam of 30 feet 11 inches (9.4 m) and a draught of 9 feet 10 inches (3.0 m). They had a crew of 6 officers and 108 enlisted men.

Performance differed radically between the ships of the class, often due to poor workmanship. The Wickes class was powered by two steam turbines, each driving one propeller shaft, using steam provided by four water-tube boilers. The turbines were designed to produce a total of 27,000 shaft horsepower (20,000 kW) intended to reach a speed of 35 knots (65 km/h; 40 mph). The ships carried 225 long tons (229 t) of fuel oil which was intended gave them a range of 2,500 nautical miles (4,600 km; 2,900 mi) at 20 knots (37 km/h; 23 mph).

The ships were armed with four 4-inch (102 mm) guns in single mounts and were fitted with two 1-pounder guns for anti-aircraft defense. Their primary weapon, though, was their torpedo battery of a dozen 21 inch (533 mm) torpedo tubes in four triple mounts. In many ships a shortage of 1-pounders caused them to be replaced by 3-inch (76 mm) anti-aircraft (AA) guns. They also carried a pair of depth charge rails. A "Y-gun" depth charge thrower was added to many ships.

== Construction and career ==
Bush, named for Lieutenant William Sharp Bush, USMC, was launched 27 October 1918 by Fore River Shipbuilding Company, Quincy, Massachusetts; sponsored by Miss Josephine T. Bush, a descendant of Lt. Bush; and commissioned 19 February 1919.

After her final acceptance trials in July 1919 Bush operated along the East Coast with Destroyer Squadron 3, Atlantic Fleet, until 29 November 1919 when she arrived at Charleston, South Carolina, and became a unit of Squadron 1 Flotilla 7, in reduced commission. She was in reserve status until the summer of 1920. She then engaged in conducting training cruises for Naval Reserves. Thereafter, she exercised alternately at Charleston, her winter base, and at Newport, Rhode Island, her summer base, until placed out of commission 21 June 1922 at Philadelphia Navy Yard. Bush was sold 8 September 1936.
