= Bushing =

Bushing may refer to:

- Bushing (bearing), a type of plain bearing
- Bushing (electrical), an insulated device that allows a conductor to pass through a grounded conducting barrier
- Bushing (isolator), a mechanical device used to reduce vibrational energy transfer between two parts
- Drill bushing, a tool used to guide the placement of a hole when drilling in a workpiece
- Threaded bushing, a metal sleeve with screw threads

== See also ==
- Büsching (disambiguation)
