= John E Bush House =

Historic house in Arkansas, United States

- Formerly listed on the U.S. National Register of Historic Places
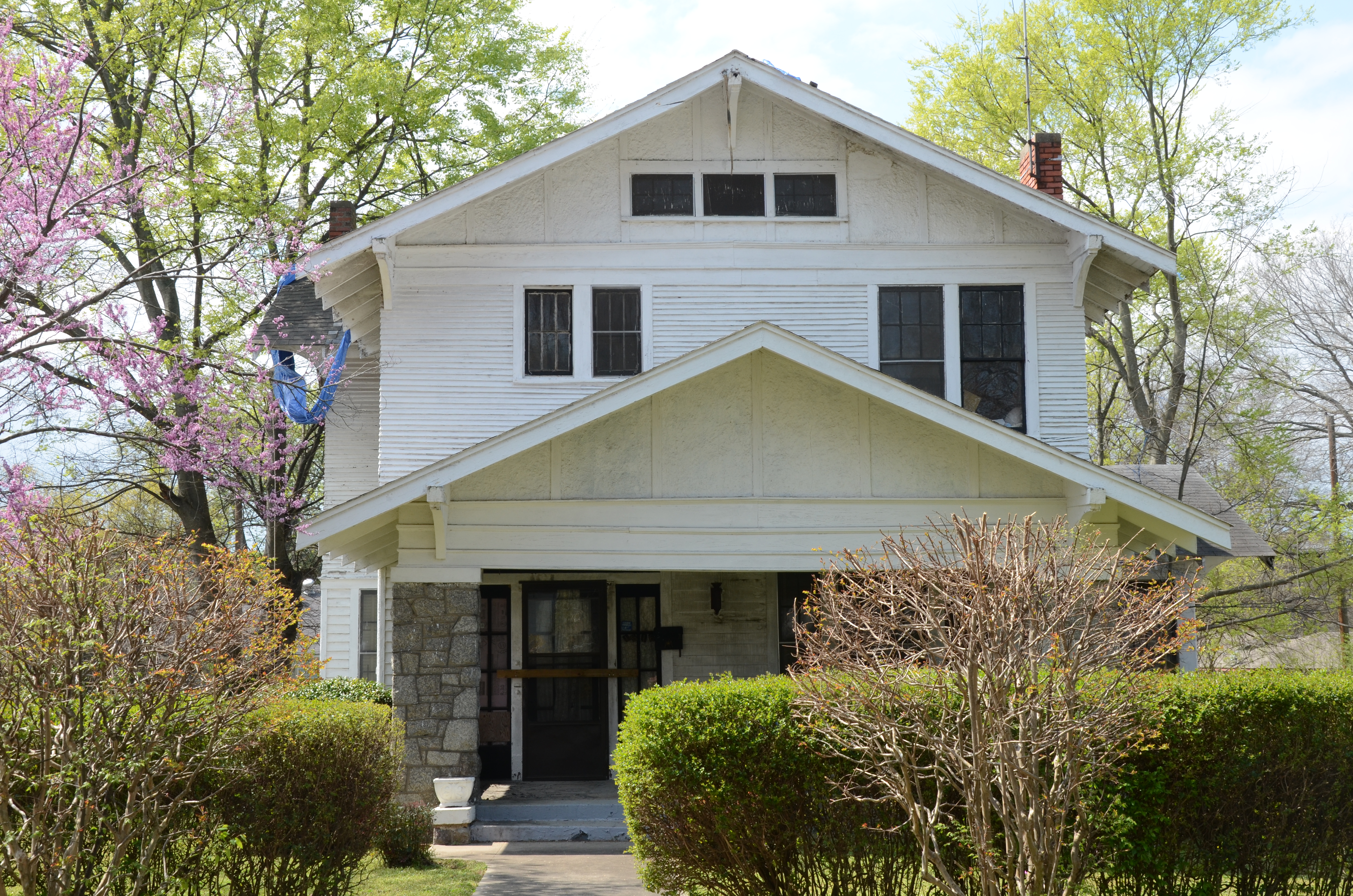

- Location within Arkansas Location within the United States
- Location: 1516 Ringo St., Little Rock, Arkansas
- Coordinates: 34°44′8″N 92°17′5″W
- Area: less than one acre
- Built: 1919
- Architect: Thompson & Harding
- Architectural style: Bungalow/Craftsman
- MPS: Thompson, Charles L., Design Collection TR
- NRHP reference No.: 82000877

Significant dates
- Added to NRHP: December 22, 1982
- Removed from NRHP: January 8, 2025

The John E Bush House is a historic house at 1516 Ringo Street in Little Rock, Arkansas. It is a two-story wood-frame structure, with a front gable roof and clapboard siding. A single-story gabled porch, its gable nearly matching that of the main roof, projects from the front, supported by fieldstone columns. The gable ends feature half-timbering effect typical of the Craftsman/Bungalow style. The house was designed by Thompson & Harding and built in 1919.

The house was listed on the National Register of Historic Places in 1982.

== See also ==
- National Register of Historic Places listings in Little Rock, Arkansas
- John E. Bush (Mosaic Templars of America)
