= George Bush =

George Bush most commonly refers to:

- George H. W. Bush (1924–2018), 41st president of the United States and father of the 43rd president
- George W. Bush (born 1946), 43rd president of the United States and son of the 41st president

George Bush may also refer to:

- George Bush (biblical scholar) (1796–1859), American pastor, abolitionist, and academic
- George Bush (footballer) (1883–1936), English footballer who played as a winger
- George Bush (racing driver) (1911–1967), American NASCAR driver
- George H. Bush (1857–1898), New York state legislator
- George P. Bush (born 1976), American attorney and politician; grandson of the 41st U.S. president and nephew of the 43rd
- George Bush (pioneer) (1779–1863), first African-American settler in what is now Washington State
- USS George H. W. Bush, an aircraft carrier named after the 41st president
- George H.W. Bush (film), a 2008 two-part biographical television film
- George W. Bush (film), a 2020 biographical film
- USS George W. Bush, a planned aircraft carrier named after the 43rd president

== See also ==
- Bush family
- George W. Bush & Sons Co. v. Malloy
- Presidency of George Bush (disambiguation)
- George Brush (disambiguation)
