= William Sharp Bush =

William Sharp Bush (c. 1786–1812) was an officer in the United States Marine Corps during the War of 1812. He was the first Marine Corps officer to be killed in combat.

Born in Wilmington, Delaware, Bush was appointed as a second lieutenant in the Marine Corps on 3 July 1809, and was promoted to first lieutenant on 4 March 1811.

He died while serving aboard USS Constitution, when he fell mortally wounded while attempting to board the frigate HMS Guerriere on 19 August 1812. He was posthumously awarded a silver medal by the United States Congress. His silver medal was presented to his nearest male relative, Lewis Bush Jackson, in early 1835.

== Namesake ==
Two destroyers in the U.S. Navy have been named after Bush. The first, Bush (DD-166), was a Wickes-class destroyer that served from 1919 to 1922 and was scrapped in 1936. The second, Bush (DD-529), was a Fletcher-class destroyer that served during World War II from 1943 to 1945. She was sunk in April 1945 off of Okinawa after being struck by three Japanese kamikaze aircraft during the naval invasion of Okinawa.
