= Bush =

A bush is a shrub, a small or medium woody plant.

Bush or Bushes may also refer to:

== People ==
- Bush (surname), including any of several people with that name
  - Bush family, a prominent American family that includes:
    - Prescott Bush (1895–1972), U.S. Senator from Connecticut
    - George H. W. Bush (1924–2018), 41st president of the United States and son of Prescott Bush
    - George W. Bush (born 1946), 43rd president of the United States and son of George H. W. Bush
    - Jeb Bush (born 1953), 43rd governor of Florida and 2016 Republican presidential candidate
  - Kate Bush (born 1958), British singer, songwriter, pianist, dancer, and record producer
  - Reggie Bush (born 1985), American football running back and Heisman Trophy winner

== Places ==
=== United States ===
- Bush, Illinois
- Bush, Louisiana
- Bush, Washington
- Bush, former name of the Ralph Waldo Emerson House in Concord, Massachusetts
- The Bush (Alaska)
- "The Bush," a small neighborhood within Chicago's community area of South Chicago

=== Elsewhere ===
- Bush, Cornwall, a hamlet in England
- Bush Island (Nunavut), Canada
- Bush, a part of the Manawatū-Whanganui region, North Island, New Zealand
- Bush, former name of Nasser, Egypt

== Brands ==
- Bush (automobile), an early American car company
- Bush (electronics brand), a British brand and former company of consumer electronics
- Bush Brothers and Company, a food company commonly known as "Bush's"
- Bush, a Belgian beer made by Dubuisson Brewery

== Film ==
- Bush, working title of the 2008 film W.
- Bush, working title of the 2019 film The Gentlemen

== Music ==
- Bush (British band), a rock band formed in London in 1992
- Bush (Canadian band), a Canadian rock band in the early 1970s, and their self-titled album from 1970
- Bush (album), by Snoop Dogg, 2015
- "Bushes", a song from 1 Giant Leap's 2002 self-titled album

== Other uses ==
- The bush, a natural undeveloped area
- Bushing (disambiguation), or bush, any of several types of mechanical and electrical fittings
- USS Bush, any of several ships
- Bush Rugby Football Union, or simply Bush, a former team, now combined with Wairarapa
- A slang term for pubic hair

== See also ==
- Talking Bush, a character in the episode "Another Way" of the animated series Adventure Time
- Bush House (disambiguation)
- Bush Terminal, in Brooklyn, New York
- Bush Tower, a building in Manhattan, New York
- Bushcraft, wilderness survival skills
- Bushfire, a wildfire
- Bushing (disambiguation)
