= Women's history sites (National Park Service) =

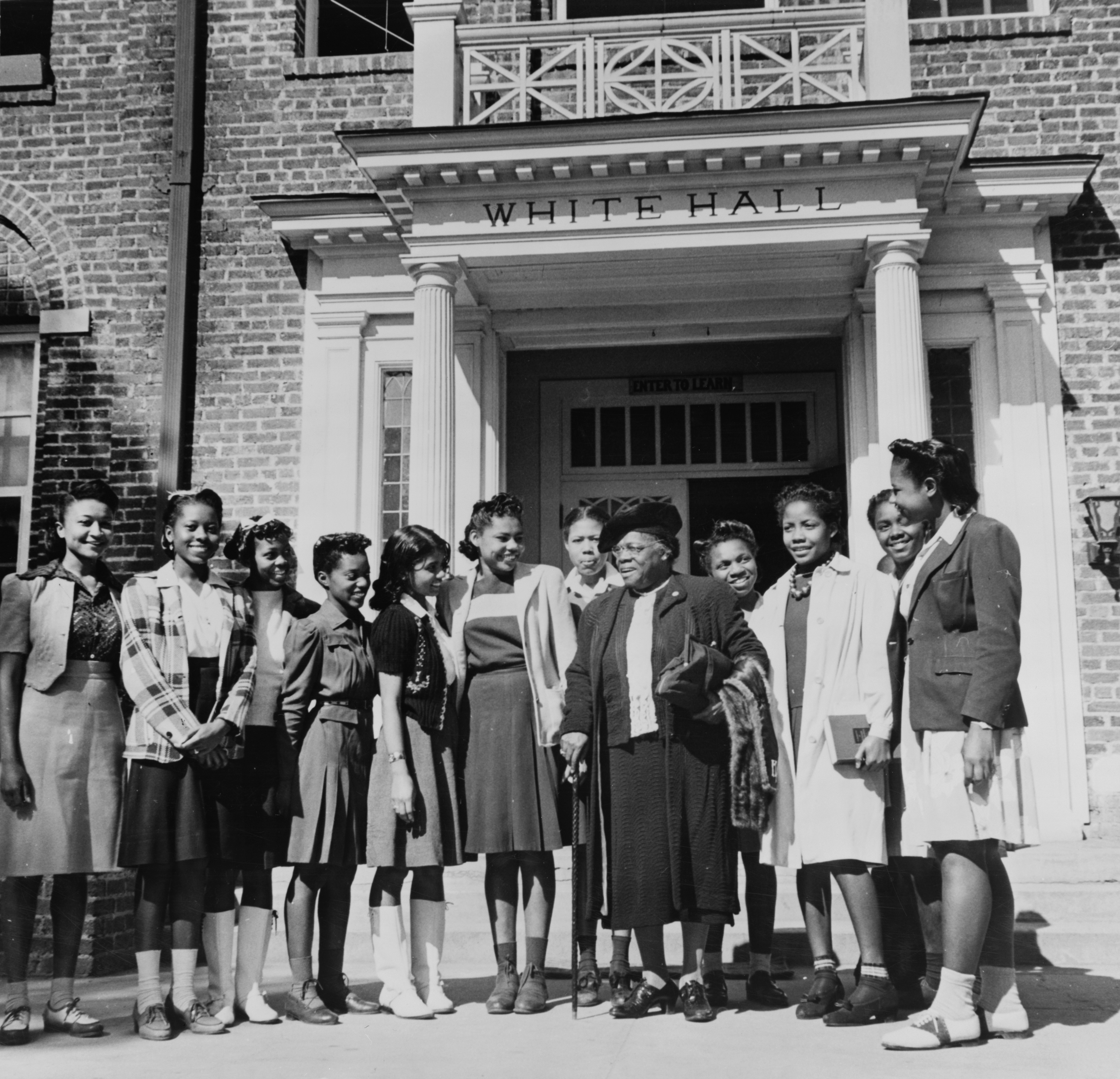
Dr. Bethune saying goodbye to a group of students after resigning as president of the college.

The National Park System preserves and interprets the history of women in American society. Many national parks, monuments and historic sites represent America's women's history as a primary theme, while numerous others address American women's history somewhere in their programs and preservation activities. The lists of sites below is not exhaustive, but includes sites closely related to themes in U.S. Women's History. Click here for an article on Women in the National Park Service.

== Park units ==
- Adams National Historical Park, Quincy, Massachusetts. The site interprets the lives of Abigail Smith Adams (1744 - 1818) and Louisa Catherine Adams (1775 - 1852)
- Belmont-Paul Women's Equality National Monument - Dedicated a national monument by President Barack Obama on April 12, 2016, the Sewall–Belmont House in Washington, D.C. has been home to the National Woman's Party since 1929. Here, suffragist Alice Paul and the NWP developed innovative strategies and tactics to advocate for the Equal Rights Amendment and equality for women.
- Clara Barton National Historic Site Glen Echo, Washington, D.C. - Clara Barton moved into her Glen Echo home February 28, 1897. Vacating the property rented in Washington, D.C. since 1892 (at 17th & F Streets NW) required packing and transporting over 30 wagon loads of supplies. Barton founded the American Red Cross from her residence in Dansville, New York; her home in Glen Echo, Maryland, also housed the American Red Cross.
- Eleanor Roosevelt National Historic Site (Hyde Park, New York). Roosevelt's home at Val-Kil interprets Roosevelt's work as a wife, mother, reformer, columnist, and lecturer. Born in 1884, Roosevelt spent her early summers in the Hudson Valley and married Franklin Roosevelt in 1905. After his death in 1945, Roosevelt was appointed to the United States delegation to the United Nations, where she worked on the Human Rights Commission of the U.N. Economic and Social Council and spearheaded the writing and passing of the Declaration of Human Rights. Vigorously promoting the humanitarian causes so close to her heart, Roosevelt earned the title - in the words of President Harry S. Truman - "First Lady of the World." the Eleanor Roosevelt National Historic Site also interprets the history of Val-Kill Industries, which Roosevelt established to help rural residents secure extra income by reproducing Early American furniture.
- Everglades National Park (Florida) - These opening words from Marjory Stoneman Douglas' immortal book "Everglades: River of Grass" crystallize the uniqueness of the Everglades. Douglas' book, The Everglades: River of Grass, published in 1947—the year Everglades National Park was established—has become the definitive description of the natural treasure she fought so hard to protect. After several reprints, the revised edition was published in 1987, to draw attention to the continuing threats—unresolved—to "her river."
- Harriet Tubman Underground Railroad National Historical Park - The world's best known conductor of the Underground Railroad, Harriet Tubman was an abolitionist, suffragist, activist, and freedom fighter. This site preservers the landscape that would have been familiar to Tubman as an enslaved child, young woman, and freedom seeker on Maryland's Eastern Shore. The new visitor center is due to open in March 2017.
- Kate Mullany House (Troy, New York). The home of labor activist Kate Mullany (1845–1906), founder, in February 1864, of the all-women Collar Laundry Union in Troy, New York, one of the earliest women's labor unions.
- Keweenaw National Historical Park (Calumet, Michigan). This park, established to preserve and interpret the story of the rise and decline of Michigan's copper mining industry, also tells the story of the women who contributed to the success of the mining communities.
- Knife River Indian Villages National Historic Site Interprets the lives of the Northern Plains Indians on the Upper Missouri over thousands of years. Ancestors of today's Hidatsa, Mandan, and Arikara tribes occupied earthlodge communities; these matrilineal societies hunted bison, cultivated crops, and participated in trade.
- First Ladies National Historic Site (Canton, Ohio). Authorized by Congress on October 11, 2000, the site preserves the home of First Lady Ida Saxton McKinley as well as the seven-story 1895 City Bank Building. It is also the home of the National First Ladies' Library.
- Johnstown Flood National Memorial (Johnstown, Pennsylvania) The life of Clara Barton, the most recognized women of the fledgling American Red Cross, is one of the interpretive themes for Johnstown Flood National Memorial. Barton and the Red Cross played a role in the relief effort but many people and organizations were involved in the successful efforts in rebuild Johnstown.
- Little Rock Central High School National Historic Site (Little Rock, Arkansas). In 1957, Little Rock Central High School became a symbol of state resistance to school desegregation when in the wake of the U.S. Supreme Court decision Brown v. Board of Education of Topeka Arkansas nine African-American high school students enrolled, including Elizabeth Eckford, Carlotta Walls LaNier, Minnejean Brown, Gloria Ray Karlmark, Thelma Mothershed-Wair and Melba Pattillo Beals. Federal troops were necessary to protect the so-called Little Rock Nine and maintain order. After Governor Orval Faubus pledge to close the city's public high school to resist further desegregation, the Women's Emergency Committee organized to protect public education and implement desegregation.
- Lowell National Historical Park (Lowell, Massachusetts) - Posters asking for "young women between the ages of 15 and 35" represent the catalyst for a tremendous social change in 19th-century New England. Seen in many small towns, they enticed women to make the choice to come to Lowell, and later Chicopee, Fall River, and others. Young women traveled from as far away as Maine, New Hampshire and Vermont - by horse, carriage, even by foot - leaving home, family, or village for a chance to try something new.
- Maggie L. Walker National Historic Site (Richmond, Virginia) - The national historic site commemorates the life of African American bank president, newspaper editor, fraternal leader and civil rights activist Maggie L. Walker (1864-1934). A woman of color in Jim Crow Virginia, she achieved success in the world of business and finance as the first woman in the United States to found and serve as president of a bank.
- Main Interior Building (Washington, D.C.) – Isabelle Story (1888–1970), Secretary to Director Mather, Acting Director, "editor in Chief",
- Mary McLeod Bethune Council House National Historic Site (Washington, D.C.) The national historic site commemorates the life of Mary McLeod Bethune and the organization she founded, the National Council of Negro Women.
- Nicodemus National Historic Site (Nicodemus, Kansas). Founded in 1877 by African Americans from Kentucky, Nicodemus NHS interprets the involvement of African American men and women in post Civil War westward expansion and the settlement of the Great Plains.
- Rosie the Riveter/World War II Home Front National Historical Park (Richmond, California). This site interprets the home front war effort, and especially women's work in war industries.
- Sand Creek Massacre National Historic Site (Kiowa County, Colorado). On November 29, 1864, in events that came to be called the Sand Creek Massacre, some 700 Colorado Territory militiamen attached a village in southeastern Colorado Territory killing and mutilating an estimated 70–163 Cheyenne and Arapaho Indians, about two-thirds of them women and children.
- Ulysses S. Grant National Historic Site (St. Louis, Missouri). The Grant House, White Haven, tells the story of the 18th President of the United States as well as his wife, Julia Dent Grant (1826-1902).
- Vietnam Women's Memorial (Washington, DC). Part of the Vietnam Veterans Memorial, the Vietnam Women's Memorial honors the women—mainly nurses—who served in this war. Dedicated in 1993, it was designed by sculptor. Glenna Goodacre.
- Whitman Mission National Historic Site (Washington, DC). This site was established in 1936 as "a public national memorial to Marcus Whitman and his wife, Narcissa Prentiss Whitman, who here established their Indian mission and school, and ministered to the physical and spiritual needs of the Indians until massacred with twelve other persons in 1847."
- Women's Rights National Historical Park (Seneca Falls, New York) - The Park commemorates the Seneca Falls Convention, the first women's rights convention, and the early leaders of the women's rights movement in the United States. The park consists of the site of the Seneca Falls Convention, the Wesleyan Chapel, and three of the five organizer's homes: Elizabeth Cady Stanton, Jane Hunt, and Mary Ann M'Clintock. The other two organizers, sisters Lucretia Coffin Mott and Martha Coffin Wright, lived in Philadelphia, Pennsylvania, and Auburn, New York, respectively, and their homes are no longer standing.
- Yellowstone National Park (Yellowstone, Wyoming, Montana, Idaho) – Herma Albertson Baggley (1896–1981), Park Ranger, naturalist and author. Joining the National Park Service in the 1930s as a full-time naturalist (the first woman in this role) she co-authored Plants of Yellowstone National Park, published 1936 and still in use in 2017. She was instrumental in improving living conditions for national park employees and their families, advocating that provision of improved housing and other benefits would help recruitment of better-qualified staff. Her actions also encouraged more women to become employed within the National Park Service.

== National Historic Landmarks ==
=== Alaska Region ===
- Ipiutak site (Point Hope, Alaska). An archaeological site documenting Ipiutak culture, 100–200 BCE to 800 CE.
- Iyatayet site (Cape Denbigh, Alaska). An archaeological site documenting human activity ca. 6000 BC
- Kijik Archeological District (Nondalton, Alaska). An archaeological site documenting the history of the Dena'ina Athabaskan Indians.

=== Intermountain Region ===
- Acoma Pueblo (Cibola County, New Mexico). One of the oldest continuously inhabited communities in the United States, Acoma has been continuously occupied for more than 800 years.
- Emigration Canyon (Utah). The earliest route used by settlers entering Utah, Emigration Canyon was the route traveled by the Donner Party in 1846; Mormon settlers entering the Salt Lake Valley in 1847 also traveled through this canyon.
- Georgia O'Keeffe Home and Studio (Abiquiu, New Mexico). Home of Georgia O'Keeffe (1887-1986), celebrated 20th-century artist.
- Granada War Relocation Center (Granada, Colorado). Also known as Camp Amache, this was one of ten concentration camps used to confine Japanese Americans during World War II.
- Heart Mountain War Relocation Center (Park County, Wyoming). One of ten concentration camps used to confine Japanese Americans during World War II.
- Ludlow Tent Colony Site (Ludlow, Colorado). In September 1913, striking coal miners and their families were evicted from company housing; they moved into a camp established by the United Mine Workers of America (UMWA). The following April, after months of sporadic fighting, a day-long battle tent colony resulted in several fatalities, including two women and eleven children. The colony was destroyed. Miners retaliated, and additional deaths occurred in the fighting that followed. Federal troops arrived, and the strike ended in failure. The United Mine Workers subsequently acquired land encompassing the original tent colony; in 1918, they built a monument to those who died at Ludlow.
- Mabel Dodge Luhan House (Taos, New Mexico). The home of artist and art patron Mabel Dodge Luhan (1879-1962), the home was central in the art colony that gathered in Taos in the early 20th century.
- Old Oraibi (Navajo County, Arizona). Founded before 1100 AD, this Hopi village is one of the oldest continuously inhabited settlements within the United States.
- Rankin Ranch (Avalanche Gulch, Montana). The home of Jeannette Rankin, elected in 1916 to the United States House of Representatives, making her the first woman elected to the House.
- Topaz War Relocation Center (Granada, Colorado). Also known as Central War Relocation Center, this was one of ten concentration camps used to confine Japanese Americans during World War II.

=== Midwest Region ===
- Cranbrook Educational Community (Bloomfield Hills, Michigan) Founded in the early 20th century by newspaper mogul George Gough Booth, the complex includes the Kingswood School for Girls, a projects of Booth's wife Ellen Scripps Booth.
- Daisy Bates House (Little Rock, Arkansas). The home of publisher, journalist, and lecturer Daisy Bates (1914-1999) was a key site in the struggle to desegregate Little Rock High School.
- Dr. Robert and Anne Smith House (Akron, Ohio). Birthplace of Alcoholics Anonymous.
- Dr. Susan LaFlesche Picotte Memorial Hospital (Walt Hill, Nebraska). This hospital on the Omaha Indian Reservation was founded in 1913 by Dr. Susan LaFlesche Picotte (1865–1915), the first Native American woman to earn a degree as a medical doctor.
- Fair Lane (Dearborn, Michigan). The estate of Ford Motor Company founder Henry Ford and his wife Clara Ford, the house was designed by architect Marion Mahony Griffin.
- Golda Meir School (Milwaukee, Wisconsin). Israel's Fourth Prime Minister, Golda Meir, attended the institution from 1906 to 1912.
- Harriet Taylor Upton House (Warren, Ohio). Home of suffrage activist Harriet Taylor Upton (1853-1945) from 1887 to 1931.
- Ida B. Wells - Barnett House (Chicago, Illinois). The home of journalist, newspaper editor, and civil rights advocate Ida B. Wells (1862-1931) and her husband Ferdinand Lee Barnett from 1919 to 1930.
- Marie Webster House (Marion, Indiana). Home of quilter Marie Webster (1859-1956), author of Quilts, Their Story, and How to Make Them, published in 1915. The building is now home of the Quilters' Hall of Fame.
- Meadow Brook Hall (Rochester, Michigan). Built by Matilda Dodge Wilson, the widow of automobile pioneer John Dodge (co-founder of Dodge Brothers Motor Car Company), and her second husband, lumber broker Alfred Wilson between 1926 and 1929, the mansion house is one of the finest examples of Tudor-revival architecture in America.
- Frances Willard House (Evanston, Illinois). Built in 1865, this was the home of author and activist Frances Willard, president of the Woman's Christian Temperance Union.
- Hull House (Chicago, Illinois). A settlement house co-founded in 1889 by Jane Addams and Ellen Gates Starr.
- Madame C.J. Walker Manufacturing Company (Indianapolis, Indiana). The 1927 building housed the manufacturing company of Madam C. J. Walker (1867-1919), whose hair care products and cosmetics for Black women were hugely successful in the early 20th century.
- New Philadelphia Town Site (Pike County, Illinois). Founded in 1836 by Free Frank McWorter (1777–1854) and his wife Lucy McWorter, New Philadelphia was the first U.S. town platted and registered by African Americans before the Civil War.
- Pewabic Pottery (Detroit, Michigan). Home of the studio and production facilities of ceramic artist Mary Chase Perry Stratton (1867-1961).
- Ten Chimneys (Genesee, Wisconsin). The home of Broadway actress Lynn Fontanne (1887-1983) and her husband Alfred Lunt.
- Willa Cather House (Red Cloud, Nebraska). Childhood home of novelist Willa Cather (1873-1947).

=== National Capitol Region ===
- Charlotte Forten Grimké House (Washington, D.C.). The home of abolitionist and educator Charlotte Forten Grimké (1837–1914) from 1881 to 1886.
- Frances Perkins House (Washington, D.C.). The home of Frances Perkins, Secretary of Labor for president Franklin Delano Roosevelt from 1933 to 1945, and the first female U.S. cabinet member.
- General Federation of Women's Clubs Headquarters (Washington, D.C.). Also known as the Miles Mansion, the building served as headquarters for the General Federation of Women's Clubs, founded in 1890.
- Mary Ann Shadd Cary House (Washington, D.C.). The home of writer and abolitionist Mary Ann Shadd Cary, one of the first African American women in North America to enter the field of journalism. Cary became one of the first black women lawyers after the American Civil War.
- Mary Church Terrell House (Washington, D.C.). The home of civil rights leader Mary Church Terrell (1863-1954), the first black woman to serve on an American school board.
- National Training School for Women and Girls (Washington, D.C.). Also known as the Nannie Helen Burroughs School, the school was founded in 1909 by Nannie Helen Burroughs as The National Trade and Professional School for Women and Girls, Inc. to provide vocational training for African-American women.
- American Red Cross National Headquarters (Washington, D.C.). Constructed between 1915 and 1917, the building serves both as a memorial to women who served in the American Civil War and as the headquarters of the American Red Cross.
- Sewall–Belmont House (Washington, D.C.). The Sewell–Belmont House tells the story of the women's suffrage movement. Constructed in 1800, in 1929 it was acquired by the National Woman's Party, and has remained the party headquarters since that time.

=== Northeast Region ===
- Birdcraft Sanctuary (Fairfield, Connecticut). Established in 1914 by author Mabel Osgood Wright (1859-1934), this is the oldest bird sanctuary in the United States.
- Bush-Holley House (Greenwich, Connecticut). Home of Josephine and Edward Holley, this was the center of the Cos Cob Art Colony, which drew many women artists and art students.
- Canterbury Shaker Village (Canterbury, New Hampshire). A Shaker community founded in the 1780s.
- Emily Dickinson Home (Amherst, Massachusetts). Home of the poet Emily Dickinson (1830–86).
- Emma Willard House (Middlebury, Vermont). The home of pioneering educator Emma Willard (1787-1870), founder of the Troy Female Seminary. Willard opened the Middlebury Female Seminary in this space in 1821.
- Florence Griswold House (Old Lyme, Connecticut). The home of art patron Florence Griswold (1850-1937).
- Frances Perkins Homestead (Newcastle, Maine). Frances Perkins (1880-1965) served as U.S. Secretary of Labor under Franklin Delano Roosevelt from 1933 to 1945, and so the first female member of the U.S. cabinet. The Frances Perkins House at 2326 California St., NW., in Washington, DC became a National Historic Landmark in 1991. In 2014, the 57-acre saltwater farm where Perkins summered—property in the Perkins family for generations—was also named a National Historic Landmark.
- Fruitlands (Harvard, Massachusetts). The site of a Transcendentalist utopian community founded by Bronson Alcott, Fruitlands was briefly home, in the 1840s, to author Louisa May Alcott. Later, preservationist and philanthropist Clara Endicott Sears opened Fruitlands Museum there.
- Hamilton House (South Berwick, Maine). Novelist and poet Sarah Orne Jewett (1848-1909) set her historical romance The Tory Lover here; she was also instrumental in the building's preservation.
- Harriet Beecher Stowe House (Hartford, Connecticut). For twenty-two years the home of author and activist Harriet Beecher Stowe (1811-1896), the 1871 Victorian home that is today the Harriet Beecher Stowe Center was part of Hartford's Nook Farm community. Other properties associated with Stowe include the 1806 Harriet Beecher Stowe House in Brunswick, Maine, where Stowe wrote her novel Uncle Tom's Cabin—also a National Historic Landmark—or the Harriet Beecher Stowe House in Cincinnati, Ohio.
- Ida Tarbell House (Easton, Connecticut) The home of educator, author and muckraking journalist Ida Tarbell (1857-1944).
- Kimberly Mansion (Glastonbury, Connecticut) The home of Abby Hadasseh Smith and Julia Evelina Smith, political activists involved in causes including abolitionism and women's suffrage. when the sisters contested the property tax assessments "taxation without representation", they brought international attention to the cause of Women's rights.
- Lady Pepperrell House (Kittery, Maine). Built in the 1760s by Marjory Bray Pepperell, the widow of Sir William Pepperell.
- Liberty Farm (Worcester, Massachusetts). The home of abolitionists and suffragist Abby Kelley (1811–87), the property gained notoriety when the Foster and her husband Stephen Symonds Foster (1809–81) refused to pay property taxes because Abby Kelley Foster was unable to vote,
- Lydia Pinkham House (Lynn, Massachusetts). The home of entrepreneur Lydia Pinkham (1819-1893), a manufacturer and marketer of patent medicines in the nineteenth century.
- MacDowell Colony (Peterborough, New Hampshire). A colony for artists and writers founded in 1907 by pianist Marian MacDowell (1857-1956).
- Margaret Fuller House (Cambridge, Massachusetts). The birthplace and childhood home of Transcendentalist and feminist Margaret Fuller (1810–50), author of Woman in the Nineteenth Century, among the earliest statements of feminist thought.
- Maria Baldwin House (Cambridge, Massachusetts). Home of African American educator Maria Louise Baldwin (1856-1922), first female African-American principal of a school in New England.
- The Mount (Lenox, Massachusetts). The country house designed and occupied by celebrated novelist Edith Wharton, accord to the principles articulated in her book The Decoration of Houses.
- Nathan and Mary (Polly) Johnson properties (New Bedford, Massachusetts). Energetic in the abolitionist movement as well as the Underground Railroad, Nathan and Polly Johnson notably took in activist Frederick Douglass after he escaped from slavery.
- Old Deerfield Historic District (Deerfield, Massachusetts). The district encompasses Historic Deerfield, an open-air museum and constellation of historic houses that interprets the history and decorative arts of the Pioneer and Connecticut Valley. The historic houses and landscapes were the subject of some of the first historic preservation efforts in the U.S., including the 1848 effort (failed) to preserve the "Old Indian House," and a successful late nineteenth-century effort, led by women throughout the community, to restore houses throughout the village, which became anchors in a larger expression of the arts and crafts movement.
- Orchard House (Concord, Massachusetts). The home of Louisa May Alcott, and inspiration for the novel Little Women.
- Prudence Crandall House (Canterbury, Connecticut). Abolitionist and educator Prudence Crandall (1803-1890) opened a private school here in 1831; in 1833, Crandall caused controversy when she admitted an African American student. The violent protest over Crandall's integrated classroom prompted her to close the school and reopen as a school for African Americans, but this too was closed by mob violence.
- Rokeby (Ferrisburg, Vermont). Home of the family of Rowland T. and Rachel Gilpin Robinson, a family of Quaker abolitionists, this was a station on the Underground Railroad.
- Sarah Orne Jewett House (South Berwick, Maine). The author Sarah Orne Jewett (1848-1909) lived here for most of her life. The home is today owned by Historic New England and is open to the public.
- Shelburne Farms (Shelburne, Vermont). Established in 1866 by Dr. William Seward Webb and Eliza Osgood Vanderbilt Webb (1860–1936), this was a model farm.
- Slater Mill Historic Site (Pawtucket, Rhode Island). The first water-powered cotton spinning mill in the United States to implement Richard Arkwright's cotton spinning technology, Slater Mill would transform textile production.
- The Wayside (Concord, Massachusetts). In addition to authors Louisa May Alcott and Nathaniel Hawthorne, this was the home of children's literature author Margaret Sidney (1844-1924)

=== Pacific West Region ===
- Eames House (Los Angeles, California). Also known as Case Study House No. 8, this residence was built in 1949 by husband-and-wife design pioneers Ray Eames (1912-1988), to serve as both home and studio.
- Elmshaven (St. Helena, California) The home of Ellen G. White from 1900 until her death in 1915. White's prophetic ministry was critical to the Sabbatarian Adventist movement, which in turn led to the rise of the Seventh-day Adventist Church.
- Lou Henry Hoover House (Stanford, California). Onetime home of Herbert Hoover, 31st President of the United States, and his wife Lou Henry Hoover (1874-1944), who designed it.
- Modjeska House (Modjeska, California). Home of Shakespearean actress and Polish patriot Helena Modjeska (1840-1909).
- Tule Lake Segregation Center (Newell, California) The largest of the Japanese American internment camps.
- United States Immigration Station, Angel Island (Tiburon, California). More than one million Asian immigrants passed through the "Ellis Island of the West" processed between 1910 and 1940.
- Weippe Prairie (Weippe, Idaho). An upland meadow of camas; their roots were a significant element of the Nez Perce diet.

=== Southeast Region ===
- Bethabara Historic District (Forsyth County, North Carolina). A Moravian community first settled in 1753.
- Brown Chapel A.M.E. Church (Selma, Alabama). The starting point for the 1965 Selma to Montgomery marches and meeting place and offices of the Southern Christian Leadership Conference (SCLC).
- Camp Nelson (Nicholasville, Kentucky). Thousands of African American women fled here with their families during the Civil War. After the war ended, the United States Sanitary Commission — a private relief agency established and run by women—operated a soldier's home here.
- El Centro Español de Tampa (Tampa, Florida). Built in 1912 to house El Centro Español, an ethnic and cultural clubhouse and mutual aid society.
- Fort Mose Historic State Park (St. Augustine, Florida). Established in 1738, this was the first legally sanctioned settlement of free blacks in what would become the United States.
- Ivy Green (Tuscumbia, Alabama). The childhood home of deaf blind author and activist Helen Keller (1880-1968).
- Juliette Gordon Low Historic District (Savannah, Georgia). The first meeting place of the Girl Scouts of the United States of America, this is the birthplace and home of founder Juliette Gordon Low (1860-1927).
- Mar-a-Lago (Palm Beach, Florida). Built 1924-1927, this estate was built by Marjorie Merriweather Post (1887-1973), the founder of General Foods, Inc.
- Marjorie Kinnan Rawlings House and Farmyard Home of author Marjorie Kinnan Rawlings (1896-1953).
- Mary McLeod Bethune Home (Daytona Beach, Florida). Home of educator and activist Mary McLeod Bethune (1875-1955).
- Mulberry Plantation (Camden, South Carolina). The plantation is associated with Mary Boykin Chesnut (1823-1886), whose Civil War diary preserves important insight into Southern planter culture.
- Penn School Historic District (Frogmore, South Carolina). Established by educator and abolitionist Laura Matilda Towne (1825-1901) in 1862 as a school for freed slaves.
- Ryman Auditorium (Nashville, Tennessee). Home of the Grand Ole Opry, the theater is an important site in the history of women in country music.
- Shiloh Indian Mounds Site ( Savannah, Tennessee). An archaeological site associated with the South Appalachian Mississippian culture.
- Ybor City Historic District (Tampa, Florida). Women workers were integral to the history of the so-called "Cigar City."
- Zora Neale Hurston House (Fort Pierce, Florida). Home of author Zora Neale Hurston (1891-1960).
- Yuchi Town Site (Russell County, Alabama). An archaeological site associated with the Apalachicola and Yuchi tribes, documenting strategies to adapt to European expansion.

== National Register of Historic Places sites ==
- Jefferson Branch Library, Los Angeles, renamed in 1985 for Vassie D. Wright.
- Modjeska Monteith Simkins House

== Sources ==
- The First 75 Years, National Park Service, Preserving Our Past for the Future; Eastern National Parks and Monument Association, 1990.
