= School integration in the United States =

Racial desegregation process

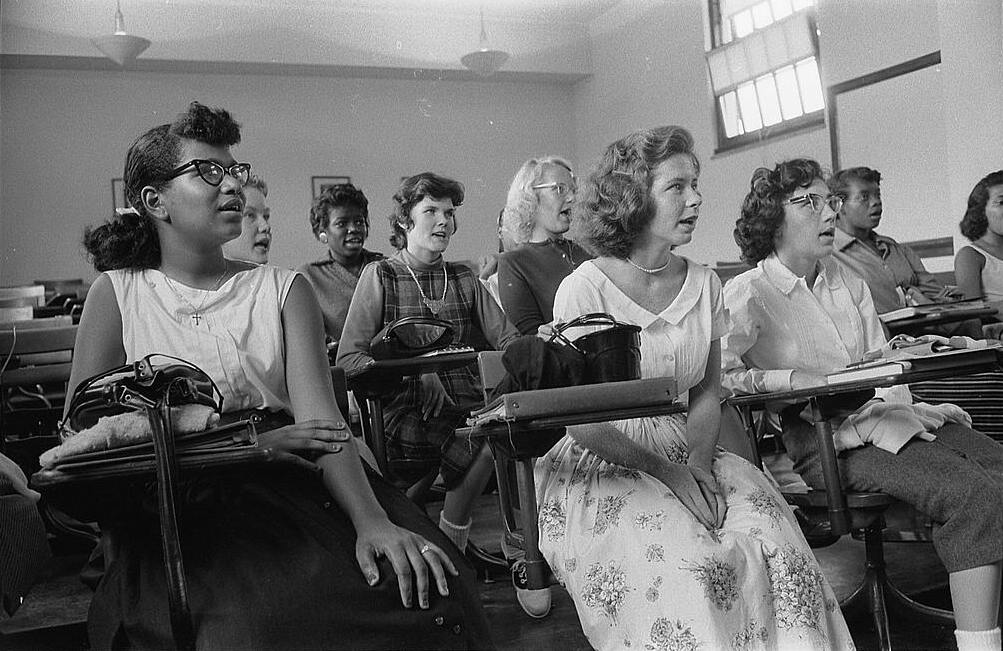
An integrated classroom in Anacostia High School, Washington, D.C., in 1957

In the United States, school integration (also known as desegregation) is the process of ending race-based segregation within American public, and private schools. Racial segregation in schools existed throughout most of American history and remains an issue in contemporary education. During the civil rights movement school integration became a priority, but since then de facto segregation has again become prevalent.

School segregation declined rapidly during the late 1960s and early 1970s. Segregation appears to have increased since 1990. The disparity in the average poverty rate in the schools whites attend and blacks attend is the single most important factor in the educational achievement gap between white and black students.

== Background ==
=== Early history of integrated schools ===
Some schools in the United States were integrated before the mid-20th century, the first ever being Lowell High School in Massachusetts, which has accepted students of all races since its founding in 1831. The earliest known African American student, Caroline Van Vronker, attended the school in 1843.

The integration of all American schools was a major catalyst for the Civil Rights Movement and racial violence that occurred in the United States during the latter half of the 20th century.

After the Civil War, the first legislation providing rights to African Americans was passed. The Thirteenth, Fourteenth, and Fifteenth Amendments, also known as the Reconstruction Amendments, which were passed between 1865 and 1870, abolished slavery, guaranteed citizenship and protection under the law, and prohibited racial discrimination in voting, respectively. In 1868 Iowa became the first state in the nation to desegregate schools by court order in Clark v. Board of School Directors. The Iowa Supreme Court was the nation's "only nineteenth century court to hold school segregation unconstitutional."

=== The Jim Crow South ===
Despite these Reconstruction amendments, blatant discrimination took place through what would come to be known as Jim Crow laws. As a result of these laws, African Americans were required to sit on different park benches, use different drinking fountains, and ride in different railroad cars than their white counterparts, among other segregated aspects of life. Though the Civil Rights Act of 1875 prohibited discrimination in public accommodations, in 1896 the Supreme Court ruled in the landmark case Plessy v. Ferguson that racially segregated public facilities such as schools, parks, and public transportation were legally permissible as long as they were equal in quality. This separate but equal doctrine legalized segregation in schools.

=== Black schools ===
This institutionalized discrimination led to the creation of black schools—or segregated schools for African-American children. With the help of philanthropists such as Julius Rosenwald and black leaders such as Booker T. Washington, black schools began to establish themselves as esteemed institutions. These schools soon assumed prominent places in black communities, with teachers being seen as highly respected community leaders. However, despite their important role in black communities, black schools remained underfunded and ill-equipped, particularly in comparison to white schools. For example, between 1902 and 1918, the General Education Board, a philanthropic organization created to strengthen public schools in the South, gave only $2.4 million to black schools compared to $25 million given to white schools.

== Legal action ==
Throughout the first half of the 20th century, there were several efforts to combat school segregation, but few were successful. A rare success story was the Berwyn School Fight in Pennsylvania, in which the NAACP and Raymond Pace Alexander helped the Black community reintegrate local schools.

In the early 1950s, the NAACP filed lawsuits in South Carolina, Virginia, and Delaware to challenge segregation in schools. At first the decision was split with United States Supreme Court Chief Justice Fred M. Vinson believing that Plessy v. Ferguson should stand. He was replaced by Earl Warren who differed in opinion on the case, and in a unanimous 1954 decision in the Brown v. Board of Education case, the Supreme Court ruled segregation in public schools unconstitutional. The NAACP legal team representing Brown, led by future Supreme Court Justice Thurgood Marshall, argued that racially separate schools were inherently unequal, as society as a whole looked down upon African Americans and racially segregated schools only reinforced this prejudice. They supported their argument with research from psychologists and social scientists that proved empirically that segregated schools inflicted psychological harm on black students. These expert testimonies, coupled with the concrete knowledge that black schools had worse facilities than white schools and that black teachers were paid less than white teachers, contributed to the landmark unanimous decision.

== Initial responses to school integration ==
The Little Rock Nine was a group of nine African American students enrolled in Little Rock Central High School in 1957. Their enrollment was followed by the Little Rock Crisis, in which the students were initially prevented from entering the racially segregated school by Arkansas Governor Orval Faubus. They attended after the intervention of President Dwight D. Eisenhower. After the Little Rock Nine, Arkansas experienced the first successful school integrations south of the Mason–Dixon line. In 1948, nine years before the Little Rock Nine, the University of Arkansas Law and Medical Schools successfully admitted black students. Public schools integrated in the Arkansas cities of Charleston and Fayetteville in 1954 as well.

The U.S. Supreme Court issued its historic Brown vs. Board of Education of Topeka, Kansas, 347 U.S. 483, on May 17, 1954. Tied to the 14th Amendment, the decision declared all laws establishing segregated schools to be unconstitutional, and it called for the desegregation of all schools throughout the nation.[1] After the decision, the National Association for the Advancement of Colored People (NAACP) attempted to register black students in previously all-white schools in cities throughout the South. In Little Rock, Arkansas, the school board agreed to comply with the high court's ruling. Virgil Blossom, the Superintendent of Schools, submitted a plan of gradual integration to the school board on May 24, 1955, which the board unanimously approved. The plan would be implemented during the fall of the 1957 school year, which would begin in September 1957.

By 1957, the NAACP had registered nine black students to attend the previously all-white Little Rock Central High, selected due to their grades and attendance. Called the "Little Rock Nine", they were Ernest Green (b. 1941), Elizabeth Eckford (b. 1941), Jefferson Thomas (1942–2010), Terrence Roberts (b. 1941), Carlotta Walls LaNier (b. 1942), Minnijean Brown (b. 1941), Gloria Ray Karlmark (b. 1942), Thelma Mothershed (1940–2024), and Melba Pattillo Beals (b. 1941). One black student, Minnijean Brown, was expelled for retaliating against the bullying and harassment she received. Ernest Green became the first black student to graduate from Central High in May 1958.

When integration began on September 4, 1957, the Arkansas National Guard was called in to "preserve the peace". Originally at orders of the governor, they were meant to prevent the black students from entering due to claims that there was "imminent danger of tumult, riot and breach of peace" at the integration. However, President Eisenhower issued Executive order 10730, which federalized the Arkansas National Guard and 1,000 soldiers from the US Army and ordered them to support the integration on September 23 of that year, after which they protected the African American students. The Arkansas National Guard would escort these nine black children inside the school as it became the students' daily routine that year.

=== Criticism ===
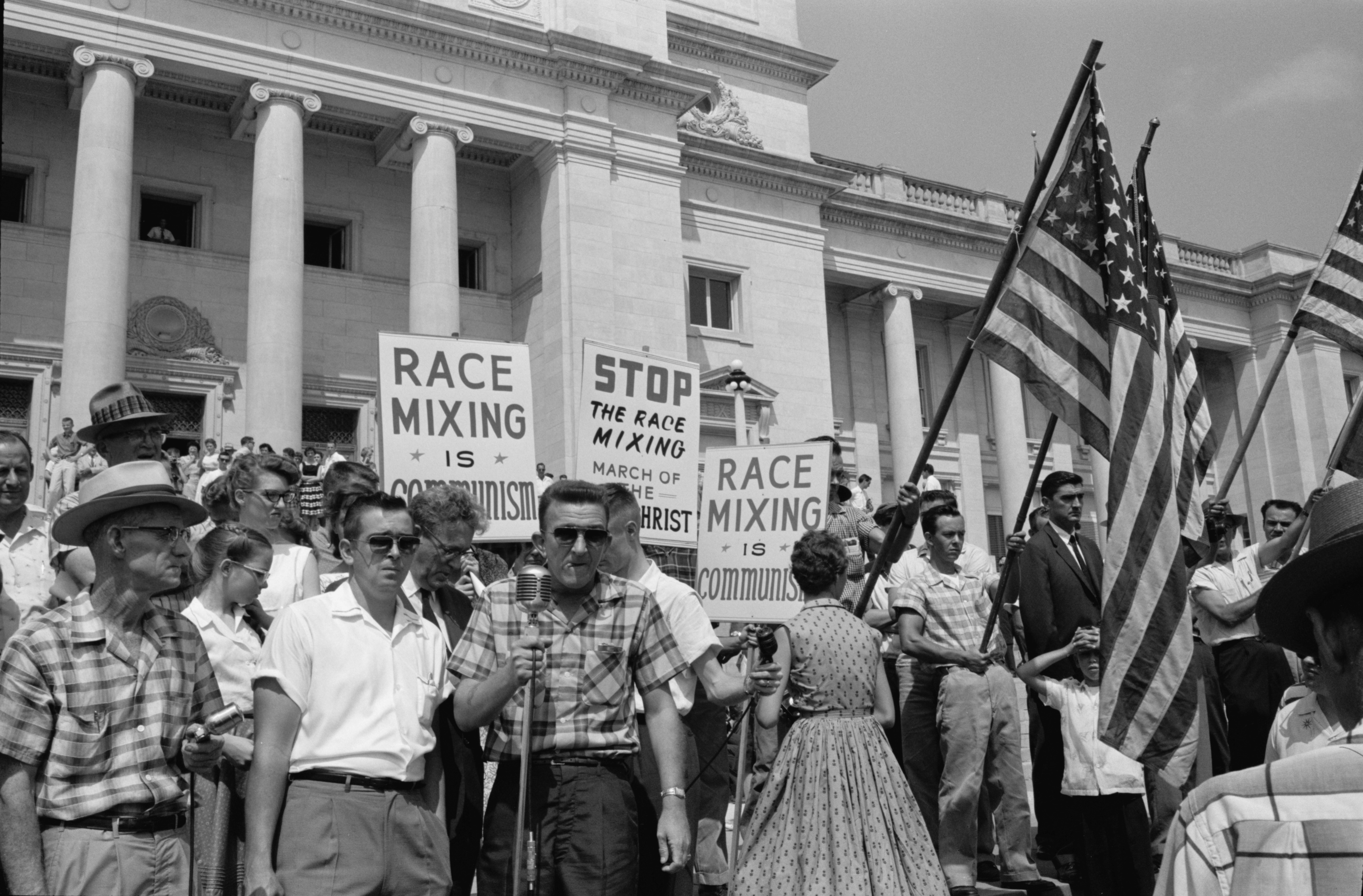
Protest of the integration of schools in Little Rock, Arkansas in 1959

Despite the federal ruling in Brown v. Board of Education, integration was met with immediate opposition from some people, especially in the south. In 1955, Time magazine reviewed the status of desegregation efforts in the 17 Southern and border states, grading them from "A" to "F" as follows:

	Grade	State
A	A	Missouri
A	A-	West Virginia
B	B+	Kentucky; Oklahoma
B	B-	Maryland
C	C+	Arkansas; Texas
C	C	Delaware; Tennessee
C	C-	North Carolina
D	D+	Virginia
D	D	Florida
F	F	Alabama; Georgia; Louisiana; Mississippi; South Carolina

A policy of "massive resistance" was declared by Virginia Senator Harry F. Byrd and led to the closing of nine schools in four counties in Virginia between 1958 and 1959; those in Prince Edward County, Virginia, remained closed until 1964.

Supporting this policy, a majority of Southern congressmen in the U.S. House of Representatives signed a document in 1956 called the Southern Manifesto, which condemned the racial integration of public institutions such as schools.

In 1957, in accordance with massive resistance, Governor Orval Faubus of Arkansas called upon the Arkansas National Guard to prevent nine black students from attending the newly desegregated Central High School in Little Rock, Arkansas. In response, President Dwight D. Eisenhower dispatched federal troops to safely escort the group of students - soon to be known as the Little Rock Nine - to their classes in the midst of violent protests from an angry mob of white students and townspeople. Escalating the conflict, Faubus closed all of Little Rock's public high schools in fall 1958, but the U.S. Supreme Court ordered them reopened in December of that year.

=== Praise ===
Prominent black newspapers such as the Chicago Defender and the Atlanta Daily World praised the Brown decision for upholding racial equality and civil rights. The editors of these newspapers recognized the momentous nature and symbolic importance of the decision. Immediately, Brown v. Board of Education proved to be a catalyst in inciting the push for equal rights in southern communities, just as Charles Houston and Thurgood Marshall had hoped when they devised the legal strategy behind it. Less than a year after the Brown decision, the Montgomery bus boycott began—another important step in the fight for African-American civil rights. Today, Brown v. Board of Education is largely viewed as the starting point of the Civil Rights Movement.

By the 1960s and 70s, the Civil Rights Movement had gained significant support. The Civil Rights Act of 1964 prohibited segregation and discrimination based on race in public facilities, including schools, and the Voting Rights Act of 1965 prohibited racial discrimination in voting affairs. In 1971, the Supreme Court in Swann v. Charlotte-Mecklenburg Board of Education approved the use of busing to achieve desegregation, despite racially segregated neighborhoods and limited radii of school districts. By 1988, school integration reached an all-time high with nearly 45% of black students attending previously all-white schools.

== Implementation ==
School desegregation in the southern states from 1953 to 1976 Note that "integrated school" is defined as a school with at least one white and one black student, thus underestimating the extent of de facto segregation

=== Brown II ===
After Brown vs. Board of Education ruled that school segregation was unconstitutional, the implementation of desegregation was discussed in a follow-up Supreme Court case termed Brown II. Though the NAACP lawyers argued for an immediate timetable of integration, the Supreme Court issued an ambiguous order that school districts should integrate with "all deliberate speed."

=== Integration in response to Brown ===
On August 23, 1954, 11 black children attended school with approximately 480 white students in Charleston, Arkansas. The school superintendent made an agreement with local media not to discuss the event, and attempts to gain information by other sources were deliberately ignored. The process went very smoothly, followed by a similar action in Fayetteville, Arkansas, the same fall. The following year, the integration of schools in Hoxie, Arkansas, drew national coverage from Life Magazine, and bitter opposition from White Citizen's Councils and segregationist politicians ensued. Although integration allowed more Black youth access to better-funded schools, in many areas the process also resulted in the layoffs of Black teachers and administrators who had worked in all-Black schools.

Opposition to integration efforts occurred in northern cities as well. For instance, in Massachusetts in 1963 and 1964, education activists staged boycotts to highlight the Boston School Committee's failure to address the de facto racial segregation of the city's public schools.

In 1965, the first voluntary desegregation program—the Urban-Suburban Interdistrict Transfer Program—was implemented in Rochester, New York by Alice Holloway Young.

=== Opposition to integration ===
Various options arose that allowed white populations to avoid the forced integration of public schools. After the Brown decision, many white families living in urban areas moved to predominantly suburban areas in order to take advantage of the wealthier and whiter schools there. William Henry Kellar, in his study of school desegregation in Houston, Texas, described the process of white flight in Houston's Independent School District. He noted that white students made up 49.9 percent of HISD's enrollment in 1970, but that number steadily dropped over the decade. White enrollment comprised only 25.1 percent of HISD's student population by 1980.

Another way that white families avoided integration was by withdrawing their children from their local public school system in order to enroll them into newly founded "segregation academies". After the 1968 Supreme Court case Green v. County School Board of New Kent County hastened the desegregation of public schools, private school attendance in the state of Mississippi soared from 23,181 students attending private school in 1968 to 63,242 students in 1970.

The subject of desegregation was becoming more inflamed. In March 1970, President Richard Nixon decided to take action. He declared Brown to be ''right in both constitutional and human terms'' and expressed his intention to enforce the law. He also put in place a process to carry out the court's mandate. Vice President Spiro T. Agnew and George Shultz, then secretary of labor, were asked to lead a cabinet committee to manage the transition to desegregated schools.

One overlooked aspect of school desegregation efforts is the persistence of structural racism as reflected in the composition of elected school boards. Long after their schools had desegregated, many continued to operate with predominantly white trustees.

=== Integration of Southern universities ===
==== Virginia Tech 1953 ====
In 1953, Virginia Tech, then known as Virginia Polytechnic Institute or VPI, became the first historically white, four-year public institution among the 11 states in the former Confederacy to admit a black undergraduate, Irving L Peddrew of Hampton. Three more black students were admitted in 1954. All were enrolled in the College of Engineering, as were several other black students admitted to VPI during the 1950s on the legal basis that no black college in Virginia offered an engineering program. At the time Virginia still enforced Jim Crow laws and largely practiced racial segregation in public and private education, churches, neighborhoods, restaurants, and movie theaters and these first black students at VPI were not allowed to live in residence halls or eat in the dining halls on campus. Instead, they boarded with African American families in Blacksburg. In 1958, Charlie L. Yates made history as the first African American to graduate from VPI. Yates earned a bachelor's degree in mechanical engineering, with honors, and was hailed as the first African American "to be graduated from any major Southern engineering institute," according to news reports at the time.

==== University of Louisiana at Lafayette 1954 ====
The University of Louisiana at Lafayette was the first public college in the former Confederacy to integrate its student body. Southwest Louisiana Institute, as it was then known, admitted John Harold Taylor of Arnaudville in July 1954 without incident. By September of that year when the fall semester began, 80 Black students were in attendance and no disturbances were recorded. SLI became the University of Southwestern Louisiana four years later and today is known as the University of Louisiana at Lafayette.

==== University of Texas System 1950-1956 ====
The University of Texas was the subject of the seminal Supreme Court desegregation case of Sweatt v. Painter which resulted in the UT School of Law enrolling its first two Black students and the school of architecture enrolling its first Black student, both in August 1950. The University of Texas enrolled the first Black student at the undergraduate level in August 1956.

In Spring 1955, Thelma Joyce White, the valedictorian of the segregated Douglass High School in El Paso, Texas, filed suit against the University of Texas system after her application to Texas Western College was rejected for the 1954–1955 school year. During the pendency of her case, the United States Supreme Court issued further guidance on the Brown v. Board of Education decision. In response to the lawsuit and further guidance, the regents of the University of Texas voted to allow Black students to enroll in Texas Western College on July 8, 1955. On July 18, 1955, the federal judge hearing Ms. White's case ordered the desegregation of Texas Western College.

==== University of Georgia 1961 ====
Federal district court Judge W. A. Bootle ordered the admission of Hamilton Holmes and Charlayne Hunter to the University of Georgia on January 6, 1961, ending 160 years of segregation at the school. The decision by Judge Bootle conflicted with the state's previous enactment of law that stopped the funding of any school who admitted a black student to their establishment. Amongst rumors that the school could close with the admittance of the two black students, order was kept by on campus until January 11. That night, an angry mob gathered outside Hunter's dormitory, causing significant property damage and gaining media attention for the university and the state. After the riots, even previously pro-segregation officials condemned the rioters. According to the New Georgia Encyclopedia, "Even Governor Ernest Vandiver Jr., who had campaigned for office on the segregationist slogan "No, Not One," condemned the mob violence, and perhaps as a result of the negative publicity suffered by the state in the national press, conceded that some integration might be unavoidable". Whether it was from the fear of the state closing the school or moral grounds, officials and professors favored admitting black students on a limited basis at the least.

==== Georgia Tech 1961 ====
After the controversial 1956 Sugar Bowl and death of its progressive president Blake R. Van Leer shortly after, Georgia Tech finally made steps towards integration. Using the University of Georgia as a model not to follow, Georgia Tech began to plan integration strategies in January 1961. President Edwin Harrison announced in May that the school would admit three of thirteen black applicants for admission the following fall. Harrison noted that "The decision was necessary... to forestall the possibility of federal intervention and to maintain administrative control over the school's admissions". Though the decision was widely accepted by Atlanta communities and groups, precautions were still taken to ensure peace. Ford Greene, Ralph Long Jr., and Lawrence Michael Williams, the school's first three black students, attended classes on September 27 with no resistance making Georgia Tech the first institution of higher education in the Deep South to integrate peacefully and at its own will.

==== University of Mississippi 1962 ====
After a fiery speech from Ross Barnett at an Ole Miss football game that some refer to as "a call to arms", white segregationists flooded the University of Mississippi campus and exploding into riots on September 30, 1962. The rioters were protesting the presence of James Meredith after he was granted admission to the university from legal battle he won with the help of the NAACP. Authoritative officials had been stationed on the campus, but little was done to effectively control the crowd. By morning, two civilians were dead and 160 U.S. Marshals were injured, including 28 who were shot. No rioters and federal officers died in the event.

President John F. Kennedy ordered thousands of federalized Mississippi National Guard and federal troops to the campus as a result of the fatal riots to prevent any more violence and carry out the federal ruling for James Meredith to be able to register at the university. In an interview with NPR Bishop Duncan M. Gray Jr., who was there when the violence erupted said,'"It was a horrible thing, and I'm sorry we had to go through that, but it certainly marked a very definite turning point. And maybe a learning experience for some people, I think even the ardent segregationists didn't want to see violence like that again"'. Perhaps making this event extremely vital to civil right movement and it aims to change the mentality of segregationists and the movements calls for nonviolence. Escorted by federal marshals, U.S. Air Force veteran James Meredith was able to register for classes and be the first black student to graduate in 1963.

==== Mercer University 1963 ====
Mercer University was the first college or university in Georgia to fully desegregate. On April 18, 1963, the board of trustees voted 13 to 5, with 3 abstentions, to ratify the policy that "Mercer University considers all applications based on qualification, without consideration of race, color of skin, creed, or origin." This policy change allowed Sam Oni, a twenty-two-year-old student from Ghana who had applied with the explicit goal to challenge racial segregation, to become the first Black student to attend Mercer University.

Mercer desegregated voluntarily on moral grounds, as the private college was Baptist at the time and Oni wished to come to Mercer to study his faith and then return home to preach.

==== University of Alabama 1956/1963 ====
In 1956, Autherine Lucy was able to attend the University of Alabama upon court order after a three-year court battle. According to the National Museum of African American History and Culture, "There were no incidents during her first two days of classes. However, that changed on Monday, February 6. Students mobbed her, initially shouting hate-filled epithets. Lucy had to be driven by university officials to her next class at the Education Library building, all the while being bombarded with rotten eggs". The mobs were mostly able to freely march around campus harassing Lucy due to the police doing little to nothing to stop them. The university suspended Lucy "for her own protection." Autherine Lucy and her legal team filed a case against the university, suing them for allowing the mob to congregate, but was not able to prove that they were responsible for the mob. After losing the case the University of Alabama had legal grounds to expel Lucy for defaming the school.

In 1963, a federal court ruled that Vivian Malone and James Hood could lawfully enroll and attend the University of Alabama. Again, the federal decision caused ripples in the state, causing conflict between the anti-integration state laws and judgements put into action by the federal judges. "In Alabama, the notoriously segregationist Governor George Wallace vowed to "stand in the schoolhouse door" in order to block the enrollment of a black student at the University of Alabama". He eventually did stand in the doorway of Foster Auditorium in an infamous act to preserve the segregationist way of life in the South. According to HISTORY, "Though Wallace was eventually forced by the federalized National Guard to integrate the university, he became prominent symbol of the ongoing resistance to desegregation."

=== Impact on Hispanic populations ===
The implementation of school integration policies did not just affect black and white students; in recent years, scholars have noted how the integration of public schools significantly affected Hispanic populations in the south and southwest. Historically, Hispanic-Americans were legally considered white. A group of Mexican-Americans in Corpus Christi, Texas, challenged this classification, as it resulted in discrimination and ineffective school integration policies. In Cisneros v. Corpus Christi Independent School District (1970), the Federal District Court decreed that Hispanic-Americans should be classified as an ethnic minority group, and that the integration of Corpus Christi schools should reflect that. In 2005, historian Guadalupe San Miguel authored Brown Not White, an in-depth study of how Hispanic populations were used by school districts to circumvent truly integrating their schools. It detailed that when school districts officially categorized Hispanic students as ethnically white, a predominantly African-American school and a predominantly Hispanic school could be combined and successfully pass the integration standards laid out by the U.S. government, leaving white schools unaffected. San Miguel describes how the Houston Independent School District used this loophole to keep predominantly white schools unchanged, at the disadvantage of Hispanic students.

In the early 1970s, Houstonians boycotted this practice: for three weeks, thousands of Hispanic students stopped attending their local public schools in protest of the racist integration laws. In response to this boycott, in September 1972 the Houston Independent School District (HISD) school board - following the precedent in Cisneros v. Corpus Christi Independent School District - ruled that Hispanic students should be an official ethnic minority, effectively ending the loophole that prevented the integration of white schools.

== Impact on modern schools ==
=== Educational implications ===
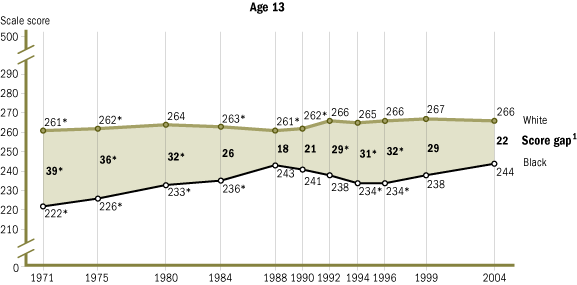
A National Assessment of Educational Progress study showing the gap between reading test scores of white and African-American students

Work by economist Rucker Johnson shows that school integration improved educational attainment and wages in adulthood for the black students who experienced integrated schools in the 1970s and 1980s, before schools began to increasingly re-segregate.

For students who remained in public schools, de facto segregation remained a reality due to segregated lunch tables and segregated extracurricular programs. Today, the pedagogical practice of tracking in schools also leads to de facto segregation within some public schools as racial and ethnic minorities are disproportionately overrepresented in lower track classes and white students are disproportionately overrepresented in AP and college prep classes.

The growing emphasis on standardized tests as measures of achievement in schools is a part of the dialogue surrounding the relationship between race and education in the United States. Many studies have been done surrounding the achievement gap, or the gap in test scores between white and black students, which shrank until the mid-1980s and then stagnated.

=== Social implications ===
In 2003, the Supreme Court openly recognized the importance of diversity in education, where they noted that integrated classrooms prepare students to become citizens and leaders in a diverse country. Psychologists have studied the social and developmental benefits of integrated schools. In a study by Killen, Crystal, and Ruck, researchers discovered that students in integrated schools demonstrate more tolerance and inclusionary behaviors compared to those who have less contact with students from other racial backgrounds.

== Related court cases ==
- Roberts v. City of Boston (1850)
- Clark v Board of School Directors (1868)
- Tape v. Hurley (1885)
- Cumming v. Richmond County Board of Education (1899)
- Berea College v. Kentucky (1908)
- Lum v. Rice (1927)
- Lemon Grove Incident (1931)
- Hocutt v. Wilson (1933)
- Missouri ex rel. Gaines v. Canada (1938)
- Hedgepeth and Williams v. Board of Education (1944)
- Mendez v. Westminster (1947)
- Sipuel v. Board of Regents of the University of Oklahoma (1948)
- Sweatt v. Painter (1950)
- Davis v. County School Board of Prince Edward County (1952)
- Gebhart v. Belton (1952)
- Bolling v. Sharpe (1954)
- Briggs v. Elliott (1954)
- Lucy v. Adams (1955)
- Cooper v. Aaron (1958)
- Griffin v. County School Board of Prince Edward County (1964)
- Alexander v. Holmes County Board of Education (1969)
- Brown vs Board of Education (1954)
- United States v. Montgomery County Board of Education (1969)
- Coit v. Green (1971)
- Keyes v. School District No. 1, Denver (1973)
- Norwood v. Harrison (1973)
- Milliken v. Bradley (1974)
- Pasadena City Board of Education v. Spangler (1976)
- Runyon v. McCrary (1976)
- Bob Jones University v. United States (1983)
- Sheff v. O'Neill (1989)
- Board of Education of Oklahoma City v. Dowell (1991)
- Parents Involved in Community Schools v. Seattle School District No. 1 (2007)

== See also ==
- Boston busing desegregation
- Clinton High School desegregation crisis
- Day Law
- Equal Educational Opportunities Act of 1974
- Elliott-Larsen Civil Rights Act
- List of African-American pioneers in desegregation of higher education
- Mansfield school desegregation incident
- Massive resistance
- New Orleans school desegregation crisis
- Nikole Hannah-Jones
- Ole Miss riot of 1962
- Pearsall Plan
- School segregation in the United States
- School voucher
- Segregation academy
- Separate but equal
- Southern Manifesto
- Stand in the Schoolhouse Door
- Stanley Plan
- Seattle school boycott of 1966
- The Shame of the Nation
- Tinsley Voluntary Transfer Program
- Virginia Commission on Constitutional Government
- White backlash
- Youth March for Integrated Schools (1958)
- Youth March for Integrated Schools (1959)
- Zelma Henderson, plaintiff in Brown v. Board of Education
