= Nine from Little Rock =

1964 film

- Directed by: Charles Guggenheim
- Written by: Shelby Storck
- Produced by: Shelby Storck
- Starring: Little Rock Nine
- Narrated by: Jefferson Thomas
- Production company: United States Information Agency
- Release date: 1964
- Running time: 20 minutes
- Country: United States
- Language: English

Nine from Little Rock is a 1964 American short documentary film directed by Charles Guggenheim about the Little Rock Nine, the first nine African-American students to attend an all-white Arkansas high school in 1957.

== Production ==
The film was commissioned by George Stevens Jr. of the United States Information Agency. The film is narrated by Jefferson Thomas, one of the Little Rock Nine, who died in 2010.

== Accolades ==
The film won Guggenheim his first Oscar at the 37th Academy Awards, held in 1965, for Documentary Short Subject. He was also nominated in the same category the same year for Children Without.

== Cast ==
- Jefferson Thomas as himself – Narrator (also archive footage)
- Ernest Green as himself (also archive footage)
- Thelma Mothershed as herself (also archive footage)

== See also ==
- Civil rights movement in popular culture
