= Daisy Bates House =

Historic house in Arkansas, United States

- U.S. National Register of Historic Places
- U.S. National Historic Landmark
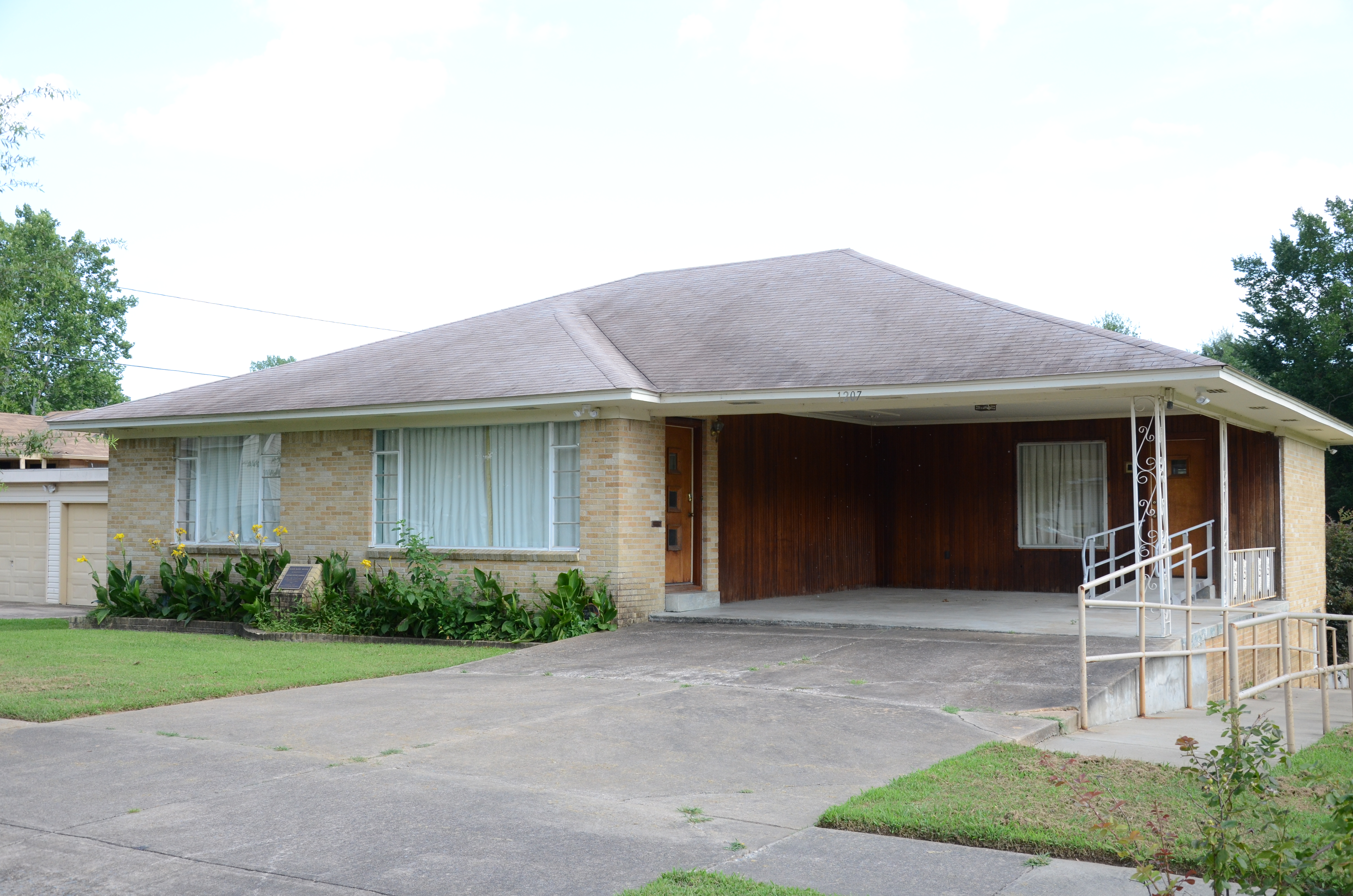

- Location within Arkansas Location within the United States
- Location: 1207 West 28th Street, Little Rock, Arkansas
- Coordinates: 34°43′18″N 92°17′1″W
- NRHP reference No.: 01000072

Significant dates
- Added to NRHP: January 3, 2001
- Designated NHL: January 3, 2001

The Daisy Bates House is a historic house at 1207 West 28th Street in Little Rock, Arkansas, USA. It is significant as the home of Arkansas NAACP president Daisy Bates, and for its use as a command post for those working to desegregate the Little Rock Central High School during the desegregation crisis of 1957–1958. It was a sanctuary for the nine students involved. It was declared a National Historic Landmark in 2001.

== Description ==
The Daisy Bates House is set in a mid-20th-century residential area south of downtown Little Rock, Arkansas. It is a typical 1950s ranch house, one story in height, measuring about 39 feet (12 m) by 51 feet (16 m). It has a wood-frame structure, with its exterior finished in brick veneer. It is topped by a hip roof with broad eaves, which also shelters a carport on the north and west side of the house. The foundation and the carport deck are poured concrete.

The main elevation, facing north, has two picture windows with sidelights. The main entrance to the living room is located in the carport, as is a secondary entrance to the kitchen. The main floor has a typical ranch plan, with a public area consisting of living room, dining room, and kitchen, with a hallway leading to two bedrooms. There are two bathrooms. The basement is partially finished, housing a recreation room and half-bath in addition to the house's mechanical systems. The attic is finished and is accessible via pulldown stairs.

== History ==
Daisy Lee Gatson Bates (1914–99) was elected president of the Arkansas chapter of the National Association for the Advancement of Colored People (NAACP) in 1952, and had established the Arkansas State Press to advance the civil rights of African Americans in Arkansas. In 1955 she and her husband, Lucius Christopher Bates, purchased the newly built house at 1207 West 28th Street.

In response to the 1954 landmark Brown v. Board of Education by the United States Supreme Court, mandating the integration of public schools nationwide, Little Rock's Superintendent of Schools Virgil Blossom in 1955 published the city's plan for integrating the city's schools. The NAACP filed suit in 1956 because the plan did not specify a detailed implementation timetable, bringing Mrs. Bates wide local notice. Pursuant to the Blossom Plan, the NAACP selected nine students to enroll in Little Rock Central High School in 1957, the first of the city's schools to be integrated. On August 27, 1957, a rock was thrown through the Bates' front window, with a note attached reading "STONE THIS TIME. DYNAMITE NEXT TIME".

The date for the students' enrollment at the school was September 4 and the days leading up to it were attended by an increase in racial tension and legal actions intended to delay the integration. On September 2, Governor Orval Faubus called out the Arkansas National Guard, intending to use it to prevent the students from enrolling. Mrs. Bates acted as an intermediary between the nine students and the school board, attending a school board meeting on behalf of the students on September 3. She then arranged for the students to be escorted by a group of ministers, both white and African-American, to the school the next morning. The students were turned back by the National Guard, surrounded by a hostile crowd of whites.

This action garnered worldwide press attention, and the Bates house became the focus of reporters seeking the "black perspective" on the events. One student Elizabeth Eckford, whose image in the crowd was particularly notable, spent the night at the Bates house, for which security had been arranged. After further court action, September 23 was set as the new date for the students to enroll. The students and their parents met at the Bates House on that morning and traveled to the school, where amid a hostile crowd of more than 1,000, they were once again unable to enroll despite police protection and were returned to the Bates house.

In response to this action and ongoing threats of violence, President Dwight D. Eisenhower formally federalized the Arkansas National Guard, and sent a detachment of the 101st Airborne Division to Little Rock to enforce the integration orders. On the morning of September 25, the students again assembled at the Bates house, and were escorted to the school by members of the 101st Airborne and formally enrolled. That day, as well as repeatedly through the school year, the nine met at the Bates house to discuss their treatment at the school and how best to respond to it. The house continued to receive formal police protection as well as informal security organized by Mr. Bates. Despite this, crosses were burned twice in the yard, and shots were fired through the windows from passing vehicles. Mrs. Bates was hanged in effigy in Ouachita County in July 1958.

The Little Rock School Board was able to defer integration by closing all of its high schools for the 1958–59 academic year. The Bates house was the target of an incendiary bomb not long after this closure went into effect. The schools were reopened in 1959, once again with a small number of African-American students, and the Bates house again served as meeting point for them.

== See also ==
- List of National Historic Landmarks in Arkansas
- National Register of Historic Places listings in Little Rock, Arkansas
