= Children Without =

1964 film

- Directed by: Charles Guggenheim
- Written by: Charles Guggenheim; Shelby Storck
- Produced by: Shelby Storck
- Cinematography: Victor Duncan
- Distributed by: National Education Association
- Release date: 1964
- Country: United States
- Language: English

Children Without is a 1964 American short documentary film directed by Charles Guggenheim, about a young girl and her brother growing up in the housing projects of Detroit. It was nominated for an Academy Award for Best Documentary Short, losing to another film by Guggenheim, Nine from Little Rock. Children Without was preserved by the Academy Film Archive in 2016.

== See also ==
- List of American films of 1964
