= Little Rock Nine =

African-American students enrolled at a previously segregated high school

Little Rock Crisis
- Part of the civil rights movement
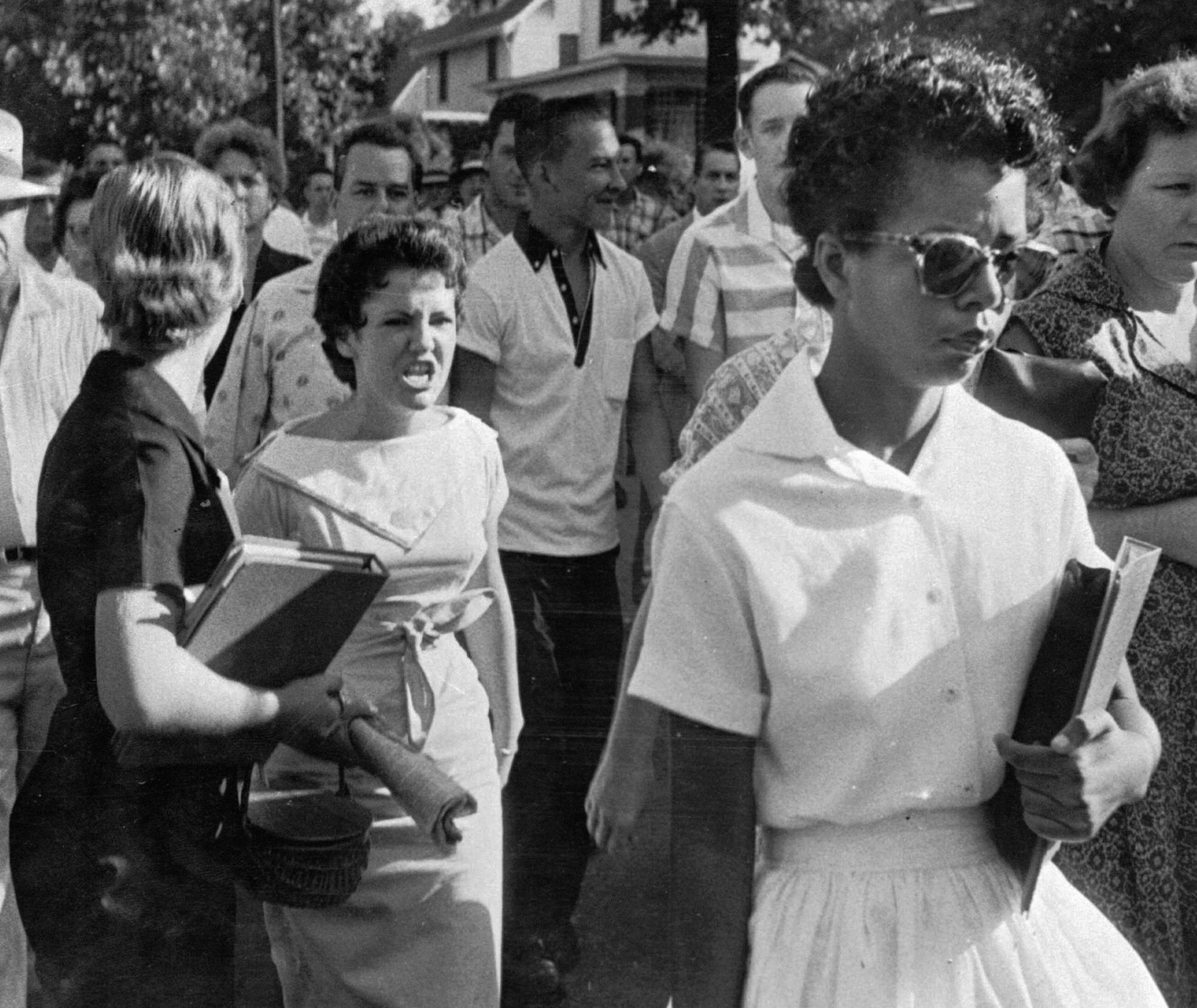
- Elizabeth Eckford attempts to enter Little Rock Central High on September 4, 1957; Hazel Bryan shouts behind her; photograph by Will Counts
- Location: Little Rock Central High School in Little Rock, Arkansas
- Caused by: Racial segregation in public schools; Massive Resistance; Brown v. Board of Education (1954)
- Result: Cooper v. Aaron (1958)

Parties
National Association for the Advancement of Colored People (NAACP); Little Rock Nine; Arkansas National Guard (from September 23); 101st Airborne Division	Arkansas; Arkansas National Guard (until September 23)

Lead figures
NAACP: Daisy Bates; Little Rock Nine: Melba Pattillo Beals; Minnijean Brown; Elizabeth Eckford; Ernest Green; Gloria Ray Karlmark; Carlotta Walls LaNier; Thelma Mothershed; Terrence Roberts (Note: Sometimes mistakenly credited as Perrence Roberts in sources.); Jefferson Thomas	Orval Faubus

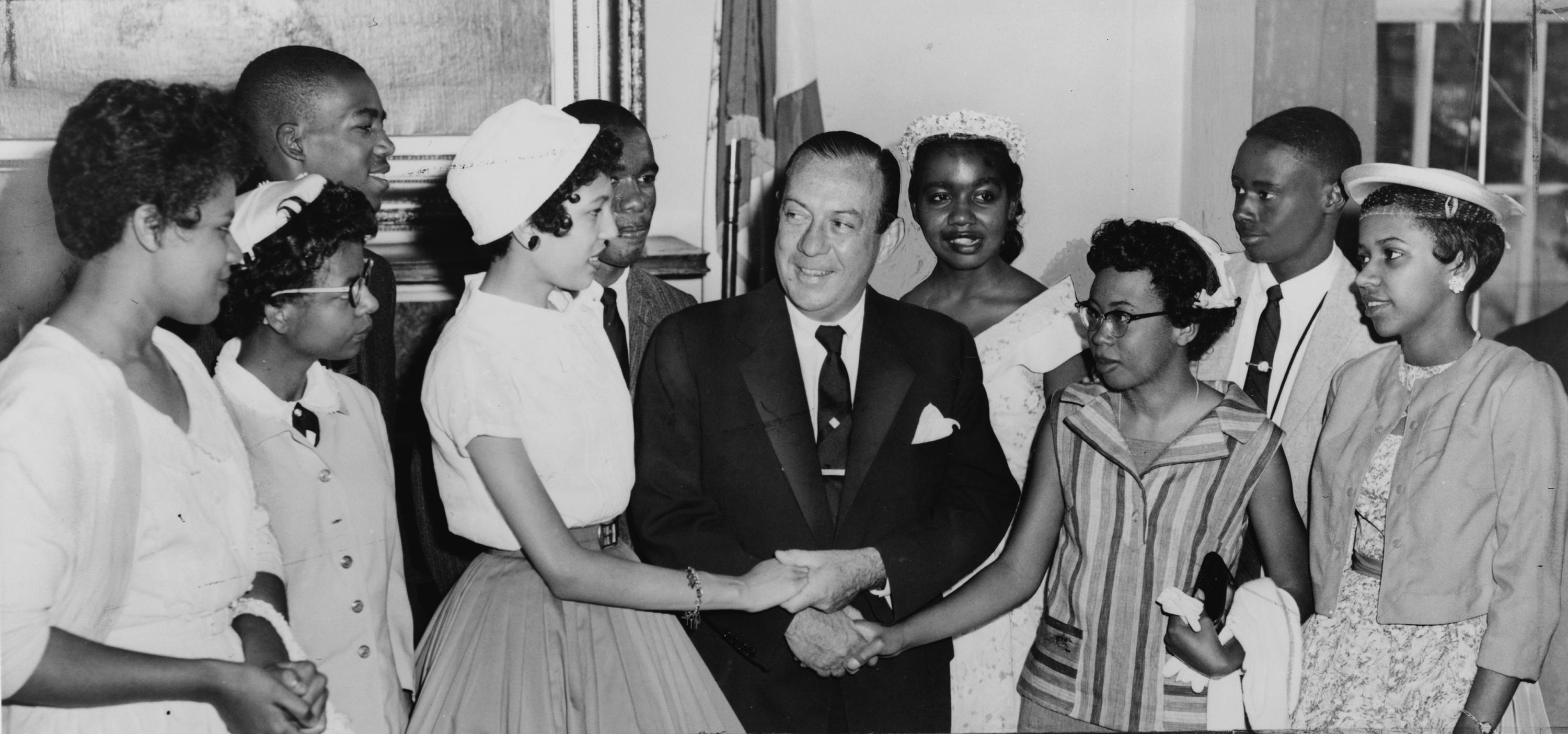
The nine students greeting New York mayor Robert F. Wagner Jr. in 1958

The Little Rock Nine were a group of nine African American students enrolled in Little Rock Central High School in 1957. Their enrollment was followed by the Little Rock Crisis, in which the students were initially prevented from entering the racially segregated school by Orval Faubus, the Governor of Arkansas. They then attended after the intervention of President Dwight D. Eisenhower.

The U.S. Supreme Court issued its historic decision Brown v. Board of Education on May 17, 1954. Tied to the Fourteenth Amendment to the U.S. Constitution, the decision declared all laws establishing segregated schools to be unconstitutional, and it called for the desegregation of all schools throughout the nation. After the decision, the National Association for the Advancement of Colored People (NAACP) attempted to register black students in previously all-white schools in cities throughout the South. In Little Rock, Arkansas, the school board agreed to comply with the high court's ruling. Virgil Blossom, the Superintendent of Schools, submitted a plan of gradual integration to the school board on May 24, 1955, which the board unanimously approved. The plan would be implemented during the fall of the 1957 school year, which would begin in September 1957.

By 1957, the NAACP had registered nine black students to attend the previously all-white Little Rock Central High, selected on the criteria of excellent grades and attendance. Called the "Little Rock Nine", they were Ernest Green (b. 1941), Elizabeth Eckford (b. 1941), Jefferson Thomas (1942–2010), Terrence Roberts (b. 1941), Carlotta Walls LaNier (b. 1942), Minnijean Brown (b. 1941), Gloria Ray Karlmark (b. 1942), Thelma Mothershed (1940–2024), and Melba Pattillo Beals (b. 1941). Later, Ernest Green was the first African American to graduate from Central High School.

When integration began on September 4, 1957, the Arkansas National Guard was called in to "preserve the peace". Originally at orders of the governor, they were meant to prevent the black students from entering due to claims that there was "imminent danger of tumult, riot and breach of peace" at the integration. However, President Eisenhower issued Executive Order 10730, which federalized the Arkansas National Guard and ordered them to support the integration on September 23 of that year, after which they protected the African American students.

== Background ==
=== The Blossom Plan ===
One of the plans created during attempts to desegregate the schools of Little Rock was by school superintendent Virgil Blossom. The initial approach proposed substantial integration beginning quickly and extending to all grades within a matter of many years. This original proposal was scrapped and replaced with one that more closely met a set of minimum standards worked out in attorney Richard B. McCulloch's brief. This finalized plan would start in September 1957 and would integrate one high school: Little Rock Central. The second phase of the plan would take place in 1960 and would open up a few junior high schools to a few black children. The final stage would involve limited desegregation of the city's grade schools at an unspecified time, possibly as late as 1963.

This plan was met with varied reactions from the NAACP branch of Little Rock. Militant members like the Bateses opposed the plan on the grounds that it was "vague, indefinite, slow-moving and indicative of an intent to stall further on public integration." Despite this view, the majority accepted the plan; most felt that Blossom and the school board should have the chance to prove themselves, that the plan was reasonable, and that the white community would accept it.

This view was short-lived, however. Changes were made to the plan, the most detrimental being a new transfer system that would allow students to move out of the attendance zone to which they were assigned. The altered Blossom Plan had gerrymandered school districts to guarantee a black majority at Horace Mann High and a white majority at Hall High. This meant that, even though black students lived closer to Central, they would be placed in Horace Mann, thus confirming the intention of the school board to limit the impact of desegregation. The altered plan gave white students the choice of not attending Horace Mann, but did not give black students the option of attending Hall. This new Blossom Plan did not sit well with the NAACP and, after failed negotiations with the school board, the NAACP filed a lawsuit on February 8, 1956.

This lawsuit, along with a number of other factors, contributed to the Little Rock School Crisis of 1957.

=== Governor's opposition ===
Although Faubus had indicated that he would consider bringing Arkansas into compliance with the high court's decision in 1956, desegregation was opposed by his own southern Democratic Party, which dominated all Southern politics at the time. Faubus risked losing political support in the upcoming 1958 Democratic gubernatorial primary if he showed support for integration.

Most histories of the crisis conclude that Faubus, facing pressure as he campaigned for a third term, decided to appease racist elements in the state by calling out the National Guard to prevent the black students from entering Central High. Former associate justice of the Arkansas Supreme Court James D. Johnson claimed to have hoaxed Governor Faubus into calling out the National Guard, supposedly to prevent a white mob from stopping the integration of Little Rock Central High School: "There wasn't any caravan. But we made Orval believe it. We said. 'They're lining up. They're coming in droves.' ... The only weapon we had was to leave the impression that the sky was going to fall." He later claimed that Faubus asked him to raise a mob to justify his actions.

Harry Ashmore, the editor of the Arkansas Gazette, won a 1958 Pulitzer Prize for his editorials on the crisis. Ashmore portrayed the fight over Central High as a crisis manufactured by Faubus; in his interpretation, Faubus used the Arkansas National Guard to keep black children out of Central High School because he was frustrated by the success his political opponents were having in using segregationist rhetoric to stir white voters.

Congressman Brooks Hays, who tried to mediate between the federal government and Faubus, was later defeated by a last minute write-in candidate, Dale Alford, a member of the Little Rock School Board who had the backing of Faubus's allies. A few years later, despite the incident with the "Little Rock Nine", Faubus ran as a moderate segregationist against Dale Alford, who was challenging Faubus for the Democratic nomination for governor in 1962.

== Integration of Central High School ==
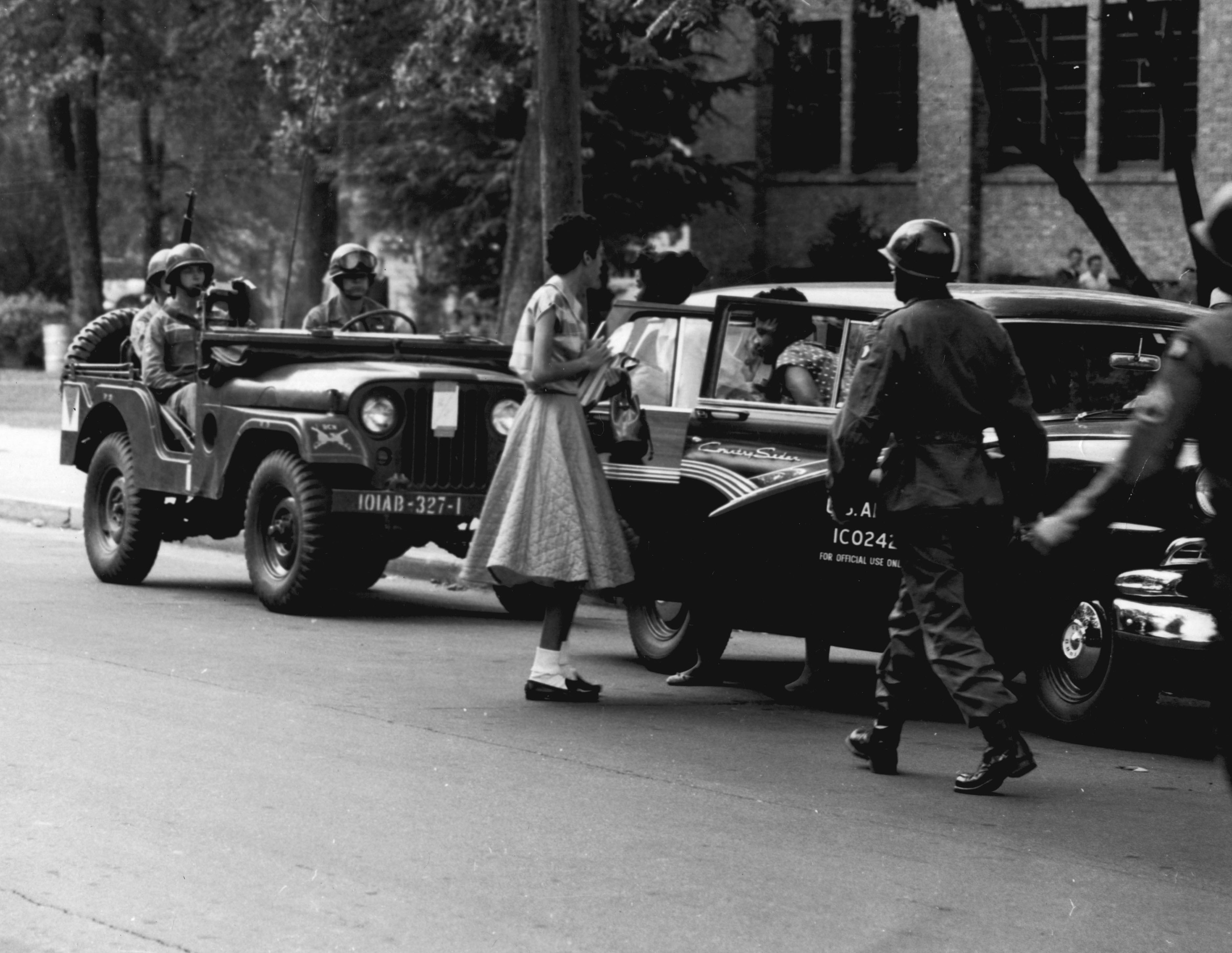
101st Airborne escorting the Little Rock Nine to school

=== National Guard blockade ===
Several segregationist councils threatened to hold protests at Central High and physically block the black students from entering the school. Governor Orval Faubus deployed the Arkansas National Guard to support the segregationists on September 4, 1957. The sight of a line of soldiers blocking out the students made national headlines and polarized the nation. Regarding the accompanying crowd, one of the nine students, Elizabeth Eckford, recalled:

They moved closer and closer.... Somebody started yelling.... I tried to see a friendly face somewhere in the crowd—someone who maybe could help. I looked into the face of an old woman and it seemed a kind face, but when I looked at her again, she spat on me.

On September 9, the Little Rock School District issued a statement condemning the governor's deployment of soldiers to the school, and called for a citywide prayer service on September 12. President Dwight Eisenhower attempted to de-escalate the situation by summoning Faubus for a meeting, warning him not to defy the Supreme Court's ruling.

=== 101st Airborne escort ===
Woodrow Wilson Mann, the mayor of Little Rock, asked President Eisenhower to send federal troops to enforce integration and protect the nine students. On September 24, Eisenhower invoked the Insurrection Act of 1807 to enable troops to perform domestic law enforcement. The president ordered the 101st Airborne Division of the United States Army to Little Rock—initially without its black soldiers at the request of the Department of Justice—and federalized the entire 10,000-member Arkansas National Guard, taking it out of Faubus's control. Two segregationists were injured in clashes with federal troops on September 25; one who was struck in the face with a buttstock after trying to grab a soldier's rifle, and a second who received a minor bayonet wound to the arm.

== Aftermath ==
=== School tensions ===
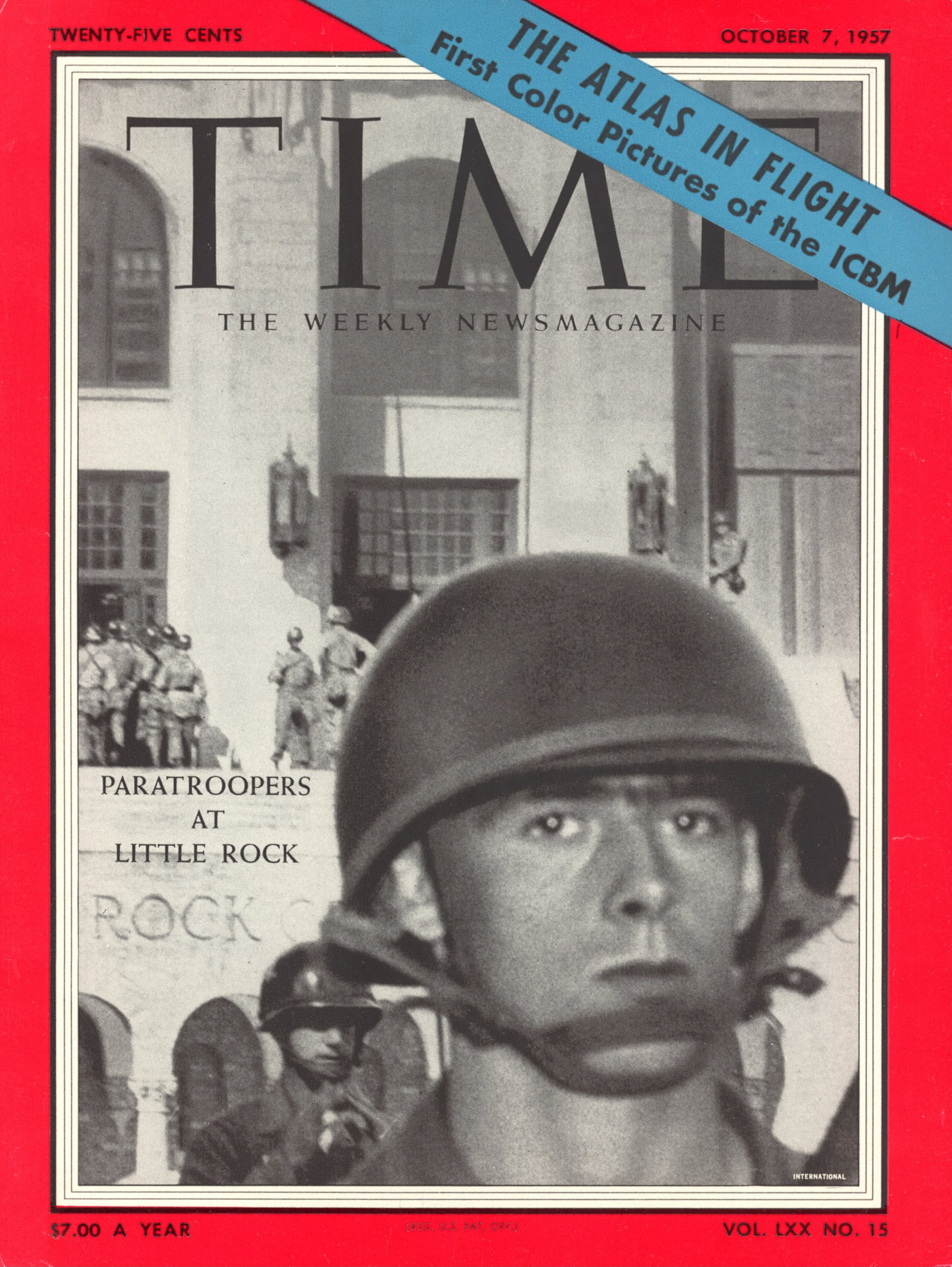
Young U.S. Army paratrooper in battle gear outside Central High School, on the cover of Time magazine (October 7, 1957)

By the end of September 1957, the nine were admitted to Little Rock Central High under the protection of the 101st Airborne Division (and later the Arkansas National Guard), but they were still subjected to a year of physical and verbal abuse by many of the white students. Melba Pattillo had acid thrown into her eyes and also recalled in her book, Warriors Don't Cry, an incident in which a group of white girls trapped her in a stall in the girls' washroom and attempted to burn her by dropping pieces of flaming paper on her from above. Another one of the students, Minnijean Brown, was verbally confronted and abused. She said

I was one of the kids 'approved' by the school officials. We were told we would have to take a lot and were warned not to fight back if anything happened. One girl ran up to me and said, 'I'm so glad you're here. Won't you go to lunch with me today?' I never saw her again.

Minnijean Brown was also taunted by members of a group of white male students in December 1957 in the school cafeteria during lunch. She dropped her lunch, a bowl of chili, onto the boys and was suspended for six days. Two months later, after more confrontation, Brown was suspended for the rest of the school year. She transferred to the New Lincoln School in New York City. As depicted in the 1981 made-for-TV docudrama Crisis at Central High, and as mentioned by Melba Pattillo Beals in Warriors Don't Cry, white students were punished only when their offense was "both egregious and witnessed by an adult". The drama was based on a book by Elizabeth Huckaby, a vice-principal during the crisis.

=== The "Lost Year" ===
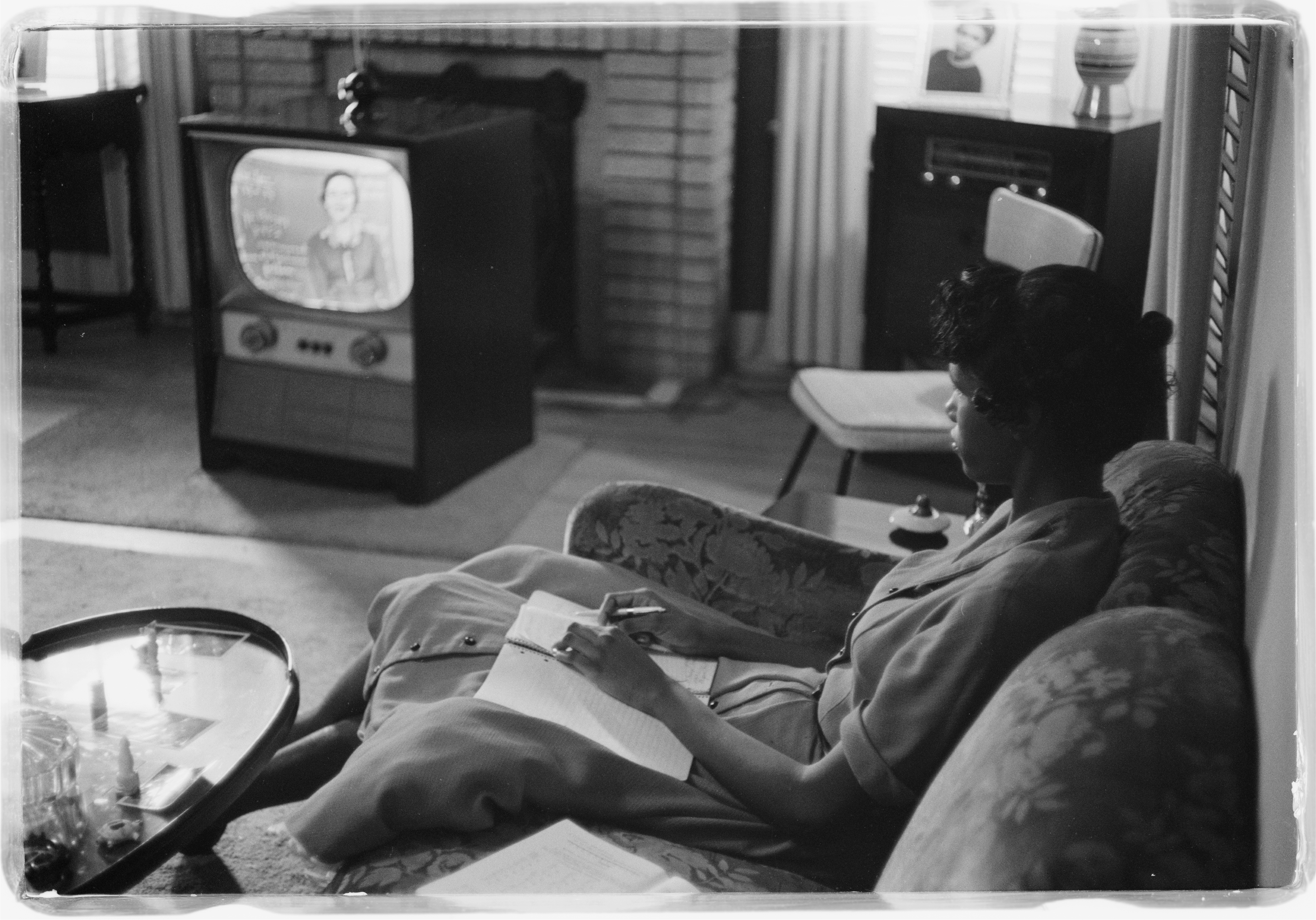
Student watching high school classes on TV during 1959 school year when schools were physically shut down

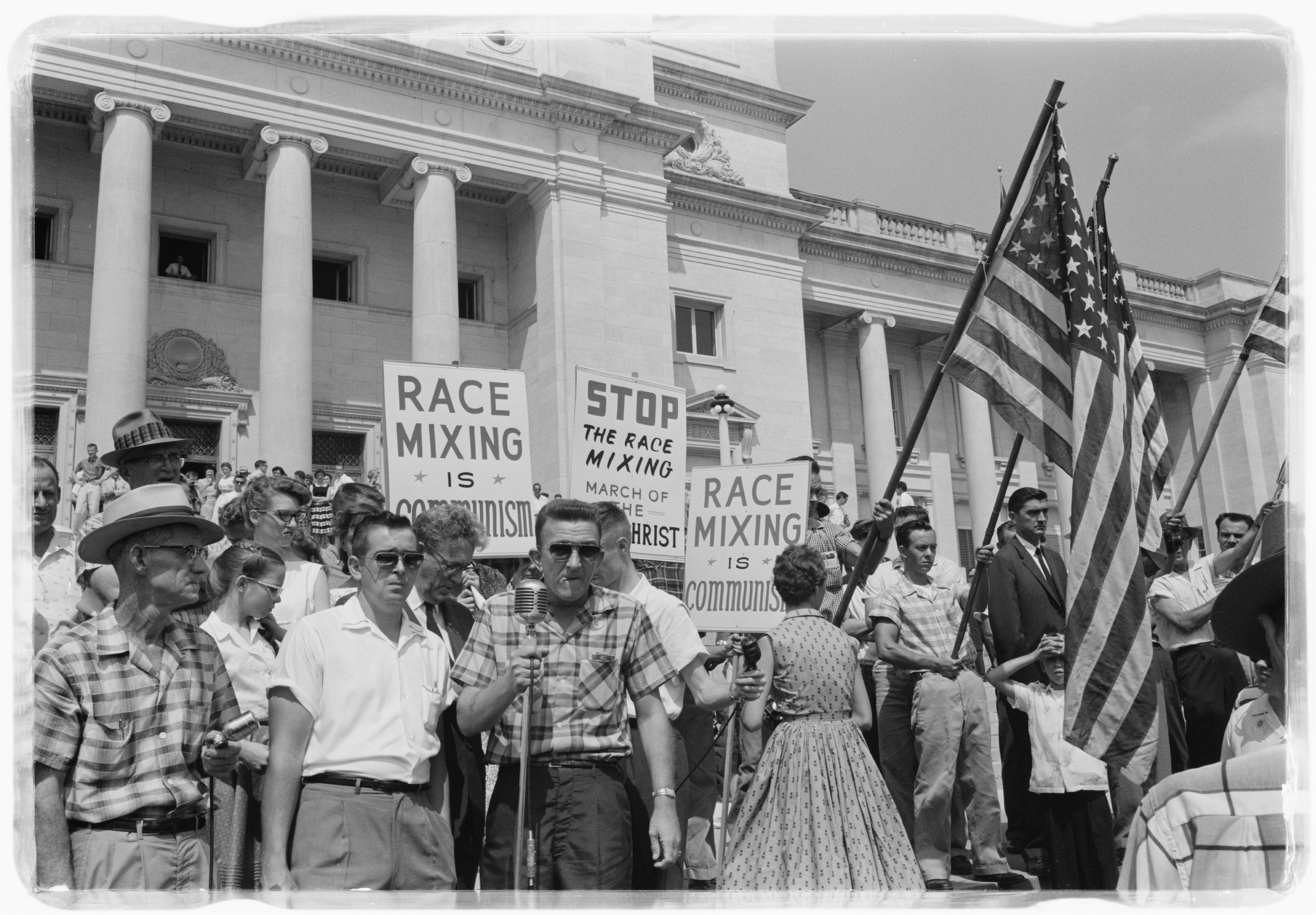
Segregationists protesting the integration of Central High School at the state capitol, 1959

In the summer of 1958, as the school year was drawing to a close, Faubus decided to petition the decision by the Federal District Court in order to postpone the desegregation of public high schools in Little Rock. In the Cooper v. Aaron case, the Little Rock School District, under the leadership of Orval Faubus, fought for a two and a half year delay on de-segregation, which would have meant that black students would only be permitted into public high schools in January 1961. Faubus argued that if the schools remained integrated there would be an increase in violence. However, in August 1958, the Federal Courts ruled against the delay of de-segregation, which incited Faubus to call together an Extraordinary Session of the State Legislature on August 26 in order to enact his segregation bills.

Claiming that Little Rock had to assert their rights and freedom against the federal decision, in September 1958, Faubus signed acts that enabled him and the Little Rock School District to close all public schools. Thus, with this bill signed, on Monday September 15, Faubus ordered the closure of all four public high schools, preventing both black and white students from attending school. Despite Faubus's decree, the city's population had the chance of refuting the bill since the school-closing law necessitated a referendum. The referendum, which would either condone or condemn Faubus's law, was to take place within thirty days. A week before the referendum, which was scheduled to take place on September 27, Faubus addressed the citizens of Little Rock in an attempt to secure their votes. Faubus urged the population to vote against integration since he was planning on leasing the public school buildings to private schools, and, in doing so, would educate the white and black students separately. Faubus was successful in his appeal to the people (i.e., not an appeal to any kind of court) and won the referendum. This year came to be known as the "Lost Year".

Faubus's victory led to a series of consequences that affected Little Rock society. Faubus and the school board's intention to open private schools was blocked by an injunction by the 8th U.S. Circuit Court of Appeals, which caused some citizens of Little Rock to turn on the black community. The black community became a target for hate crimes since people blamed them for the closing of the schools. Daisy Bates, head of the NAACP chapter in Little Rock, was a primary victim of these crimes, in addition to the black students enrolled at Little Rock Central High School and their families.

The city's teachers were also placed in a difficult position. They were forced to swear loyalty to Faubus's bills. Even though Faubus's idea of private schools never played out, the teachers were still bound by their contracts and expected to attend school every day.

In May 1959, after the firing of forty-four teachers and administrative staff from the four high schools, three segregationist board members were replaced with three moderate ones. The new board members reinstated the forty-four staff members to their positions. The new board of directors then began an attempt to reopen the schools, much to Faubus's dismay. In order to avoid any further complications, the public high schools were scheduled to open earlier than usual, on August 12, 1959.

Although the Lost Year had come to a close, the black students who returned to the high schools were not welcomed by the other students. Rather, the black students had a difficult time getting past mobs to enter the school, and, once inside, they were often subject to physical and emotional abuse. The students were back at school and everything would eventually resume normal function, but the Lost Year would be a pretext for new hatred toward the black students in the public high school.

In November 1958, Life magazine had profiled high school students affected by school closures, "nearly ... 13,000 in Virginia and 3,700 more in Little Rock, all passive victims in a national tragedy."

== Legacy ==
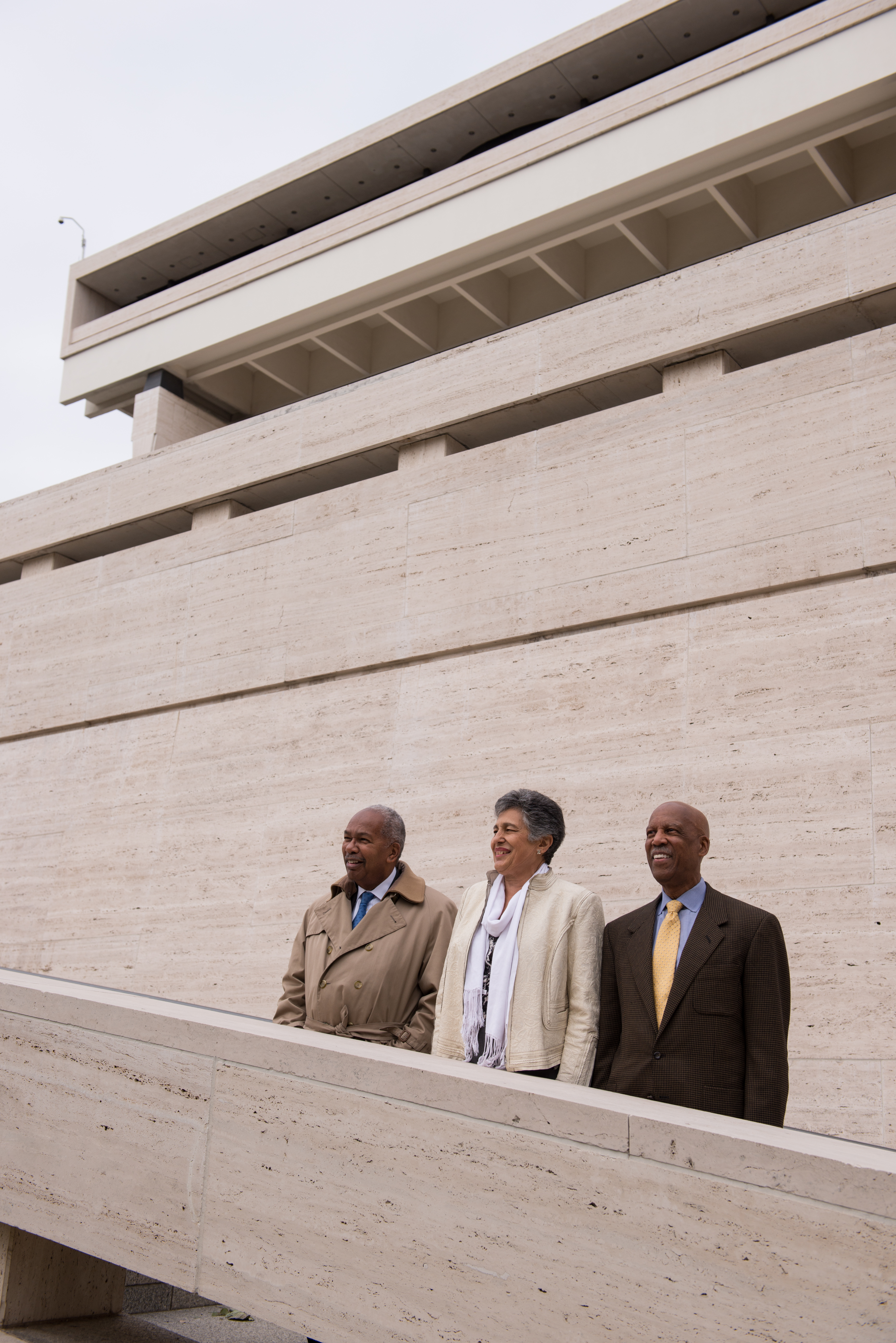
Three members of the "Little Rock Nine" (L-R) Ernest Green, Carlotta Walls LaNier, and Terrence Roberts – stand together on the steps of the LBJ Presidential Library in 2014

Little Rock Central High School still functions as part of the Little Rock School District and is now a National Historic Site that houses a Civil Rights Museum, administered in partnership with the National Park Service, to commemorate the events of 1957. The Daisy Bates House, home to Daisy Bates, then the president of the Arkansas NAACP and a focal point for the students, was designated a National Historic Landmark in 2001 for its role in the episode.

In 1958, Cuban poet Nicolás Guillén published "Little Rock", a bilingual composition in English and Spanish denouncing the racial segregation in the United States.

Melba Pattillo Beals wrote a memoir titled Warriors Don't Cry, published in 1994.

Two made-for-television movies have depicted the events of the crisis: the 1981 CBS movie Crisis at Central High, and the 1993 Disney Channel movie The Ernest Green Story.

In 1996, seven of the Little Rock Nine appeared on The Oprah Winfrey Show. They came face to face with a few of the white students who had tormented them as well as one student who had befriended them.

In 1997, Central High Museum, Inc. held a dedication ceremony in observation of the 40th anniversary of the desegregation. With restoration help from the Mobil Foundation, they opened the first visitor center near the High School that September, in a former Mobil gas station. African-American artist George Hunt was hired to produce a painting of the Little Rock Nine for the event.

In November 1998, legislation passed designating Little Rock Central High School National Historic Site as a unit of the National Park Service, and Central High Museum, Inc., donated their property to the park service. While the NPS visitor center was under construction, Hunt's painting, titled "America Cares", hung in the White House.

In February 1999, members created the Little Rock Nine Foundation which established a scholarship program which had funded, by 2013, 60 university students. In 2013, the foundation decided to exclusively fund students attending the Clinton School of Public Service at the University of Arkansas.

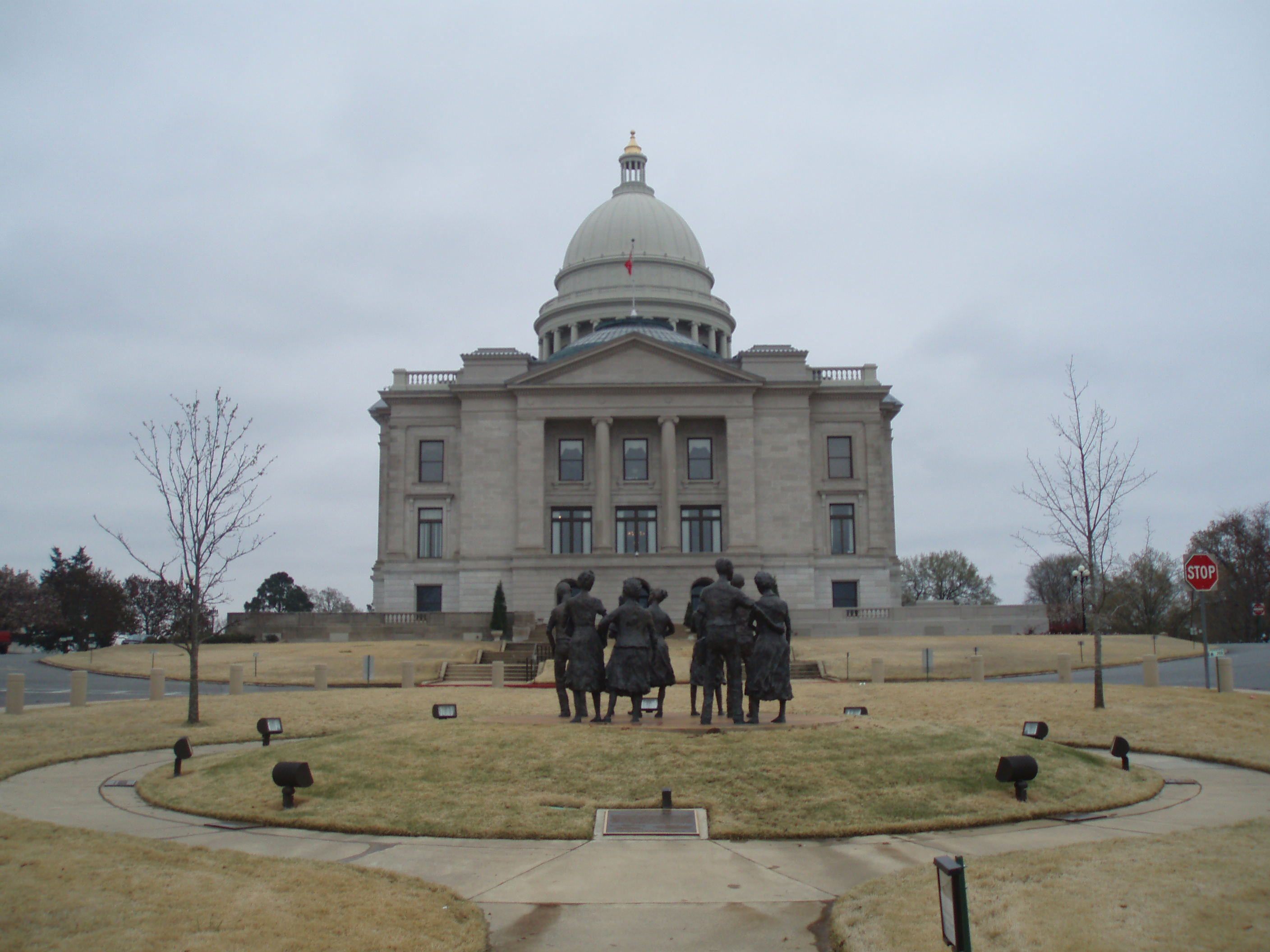
Memorial at Arkansas State Capitol

President Bill Clinton honored the Little Rock Nine in November 1999 when he presented them each with a Congressional Gold Medal. The medal is the highest civilian award bestowed by Congress. It is given to those who have provided outstanding service to the country. To receive the Congressional Gold Medal, recipients must be co-sponsored by two-thirds of both the House and Senate.

In 2004, art director Ethel Kessler selected George Hunt's Little Rock Nine/America Cares painting for a 37-cent U.S. Postage Stamp. It was one of 10 stamps depicting milestones of the Civil Rights Movement in a February 2005 Black History Month commemorative stamp panel, "To Form a More Perfect Union". Printed on top of the artwork on the stamp were the words, "1957 The Little Rock Nine".

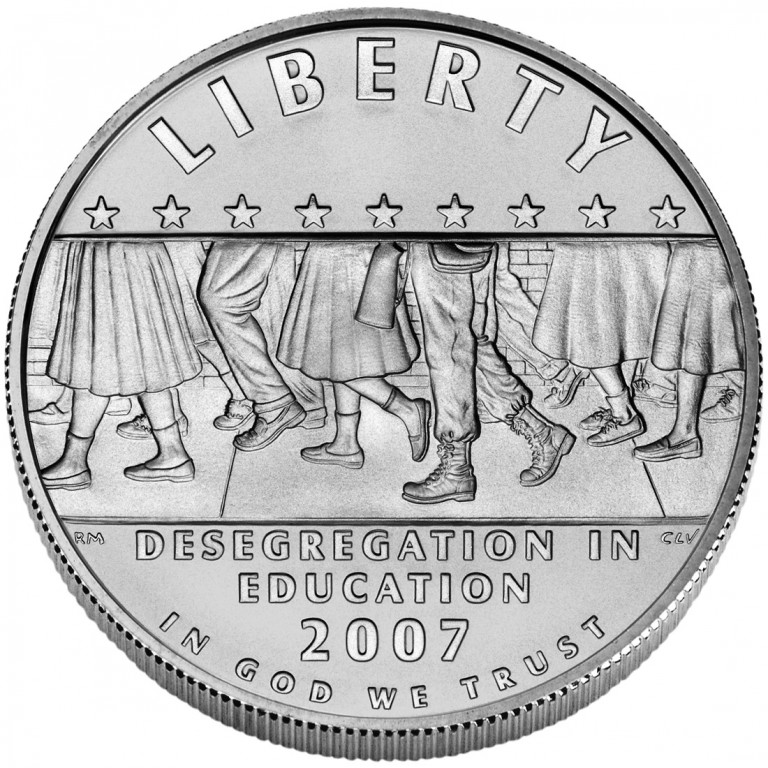
The obverse of the 2007 Little Rock Central High School Desegregation silver dollar designed by Richard Alan Masters

In 2007, the United States Mint made available the Little Rock Central High School Desegregation silver dollar, a commemorative coin to "recognize and pay tribute to the strength, the determination and the courage displayed by African-American high school students in the fall of 1957." The obverse depicts students accompanied by a soldier, with nine stars symbolizing the Little Rock Nine. The reverse depicts an image of Little Rock Central High School, c. 1957. Proceeds from the coin sales were used to improve the National Historic Site.

On December 9, 2008, the Little Rock Nine were invited to attend the inauguration of President-elect Barack Obama, the first African-American to be elected President of the United States.

On February 9, 2010, Marquette University honored the group by presenting them with the Père Marquette Discovery Award, the university's highest honor, one that had previously been given to Mother Teresa, Archbishop Desmond Tutu, Karl Rahner, and the Apollo 11 astronauts.

On November 19, 2022, Elizabeth Eckford, Ernest Green, Gloria Ray Karlmark, Carlotta Walls LaNier and Thelma Mothershed-Wair etched their initials onto metal plates that were then welded onto the keel of the attack submarine USS Arkansas (SSN-800) in a ceremony at Newport News Shipbuilding in Newport News, Virginia. The plates will remain affixed to the submarine throughout its life. Melba Pattillo Beals and Minnijean Brown-Trickey were also named sponsors of the ship, and all members of the Little Rock Nine were honored. Elizabeth Eckford said "(Former Navy) Secretary Ray Mabus asked us to be supporters of the ship and its crew. I signed on to be a foster grandmother ... President Eisenhower sent 1,000 paratroopers to Little Rock to disperse a mob, bring order, and they made it possible for us to enter Central High School. From that point, I've had very high regard for specially trained forces."

=== Foreign affairs ===
The crisis at Little Rock took place amid the Cold War. Civil rights historian Mary L. Dudziak argues that President Dwight D. Eisenhower and the U.S. federal government's primary concern in their response was the world's perception of the U.S.; Secretary of State John Foster Dulles was particularly aware of the global impact, telling Attorney General Herbert Brownell over a phone call that "this situation was ruining our foreign policy". Brownell asked Dulles to look over a draft of the President's speech in Arkansas following the crisis, where he suggested that Eisenhower "put in a few more sentences ... emphasizing the harm done abroad".

Dudziak highlights other evidence such as U.S. Department of Justice briefs and propaganda to show the global implications of Little Rock. The crisis came partly as a result of the Brown vs Board of Education case. U.S. Department of Justice briefs gave only one reason for involvement in cases like this; that segregation harmed U.S. foreign relations. The briefs argued that the existence of discrimination had an adverse effect on relations with other countries, especially countries in the third world who had been targeted by the Truman Doctrine. Evidence of U.S. propaganda can be seen in the booklet The Negro in American Life, which was translated into fifteen languages and distributed to many countries. It aimed to reverse the global shame surrounding discrimination in America, accentuated by Soviet propaganda, and instead boasted of the progress that they believed could be achieved in an American democracy.

The impact of foreign relations, foreign policy and America's global reputation played an important role in Eisenhower's response to the crisis at Little Rock. This eventually culminated in his decisions to order the intervention of the 101st Airborne Division and to federalize the National Guard.

== See also ==
- Dorothy Counts
- Delois Huntley
- Ethnic hatred
- "Fables of Faubus", a song written by jazz bassist Charles Mingus
- History of African-American education
- "Little Rock" (poem)
- Nine from Little Rock, an Academy Award-winning documentary film about the Little Rock Nine
- Ruby Bridges
- Stand in the Schoolhouse Door
- Women's Emergency Committee to Open Our Schools

== References and further reading ==
- Anderson, Karen. Little Rock: Race and Resistance at Central High School (Princeton University Press, 2010) ISBN 9780691092935
- Baer, Frances Lisa. Resistance to Public School Desegregation: Little Rock, Arkansas, and Beyond (LFB Scholarly Publishing, 2008) 328 pp. ISBN 978-1-59332-260-1
- Beals, Melba Pattillo. Warriors Don't Cry: A Searing Memoir of the Battle to Integrate Little Rock's Central High. (Simon and Schuster, 2007) ISBN 0-671-86638-9
- Branton, Wiley A. "Little Rock Revisited: Desegregation to Resegregation." Journal of Negro Education 1983 52(3): 250–269. ISSN 0022-2984 Fulltext in Jstor
- Calloway, Carolyn et al. "Daisy Bates and the Little Rock School Crisis: Forging the Way". Journal of Black Studies (1996) 5#26: 616–628. doi:10.1177/002193479602600507. S2CID 145431981
- Fradin, Judith Bloom, and Dennis B. Fradin. The power of one: Daisy Bates and the little Rock Nine (Houghton Mifflin Harcourt, 2004). ISBN 978-0618315567.
- Jacoway, Elizabeth. Turn Away Thy Son: Little Rock, the Crisis That Shocked the Nation (University of Arkansas Press, 2007). ISBN 9780743297196.
- Kirk, John A. "Not Quite Black and White: School Desegregation in Arkansas, 1954–1966," Arkansas Historical Quarterly (2011) 70#3 pp 225–257 JSTOR 23193404
- Kirk, John A., ed. An Epitaph for Little Rock: A Fiftieth Anniversary Retrospective on the Central High Crisis (University of Arkansas Press, 2008). ISBN 978-1-55728-874-5.
- Kirk, John A. Beyond Little Rock: The Origins and Legacies of the Central High Crisis (University of Arkansas Press, 2007). ISBN 978-1557288509.
- Kirk, John A., Redefining the Color Line: Black Activism in Little Rock, Arkansas, 1940–1970 (University of Florida Press, 2002). ISBN 978-0813029238.
- Kirk, John A. "Daisy Bates, the National Association for the Advancement of Colored People, and the 1957 Little Rock School Crisis: A Gendered Perspective." in Gender in the Civil Rights Movement, ed. P.J. Ling and S. Monteith (Routledge, 2014) pp. 17–40. ISBN 0-8135-3438-0.
- Reed, Roy. Faubus: The Life and Times of an American Prodigal (University of Arkansas Press, 1997). ISBN 978-1557284570.
- Stockley, Grif. Daisy Bates: Civil Rights Crusader from Arkansas (University Press of Mississippi, 2012). ISBN 978-1617037245.

=== Historiography ===
- Bartley, Numan V. "Looking Back at Little Rock." Arkansas Historical Quarterly 25.2 (1966): 101–116. online
- Pierce, Michael. "Historians of the Central High Crisis and Little Rock's Working-Class Whites: A Review Essay," Arkansas Historical Quarterly (2011) 70#4 pp. 468–483 in JSTOR

=== Primary sources ===
- Bates, Daisy (2007). The long shadow of Little Rock: A memoir. University of Arkansas Press. ISBN 978-1557288639.
- Faubus, Orval Eugene. Down from the Hills. Pioneer, 1980. 510 pp. autobiography.
- Lanier, Carlotta, A Mighty Long Way: My Journey to Justice at Little Rock Central High School, Random House, 2009, ISBN 978-0345511003.
