= Terrence Roberts =

American activist and professor (born 1941)

Terrence James Roberts
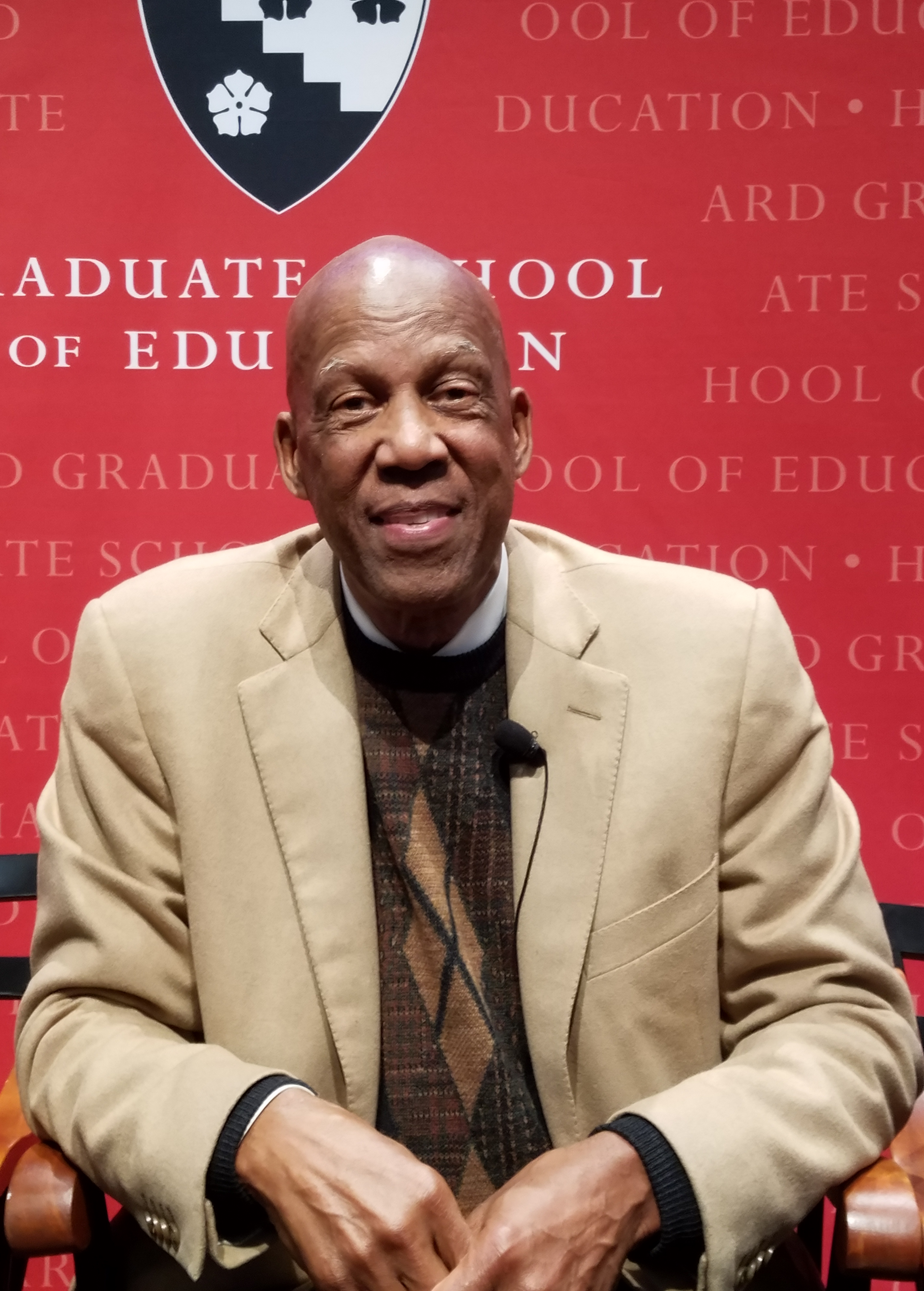
- Terrence Roberts speaking at the Harvard Graduate School of Education, February 9, 2017.
- Born: December 3, 1941 (age 84); Little Rock, Arkansas, U.S.
- Movement: Civil Rights Movement
- Awards: Congressional Gold Medal; Spingarn Medal

Terrence James Roberts (born December 3, 1941) is one of the Little Rock Nine, a group of African-American students who, in 1957, were the first black students ever to attend classes at Little Rock Central High School in Little Rock, Arkansas. In 1999, he and the other people of the Little Rock Nine were awarded the Congressional Gold Medal by President Bill Clinton.

== Early life and education ==
Terrence Roberts was born in Little Rock, Arkansas, to William L. and Margaret G. Roberts. He first attended the segregated schools M. W. Gibbs elementary, Dunbar Junior High School and Horace Mann High School. In 1957, he volunteered to attend the all-white Little Rock Central High School the next fall, helping to desegregate one of the nation's largest schools.

On September 4, 1957, the Little Rock Nine made an unsuccessful attempt to enter Central High School, which had been segregated. The Arkansas National Guard, under orders from the governor, and an angry mob of about 400 surrounded the school and prevented them from going in. On September 23, 1957, a mob of about 1000 people surrounded the school again as the students attempted to enter. The following day, President Dwight D. Eisenhower federalized the Arkansas National Guard and dispatched members of the 101st Airborne Division to accompany the students to school for protection. Federal and state military personnel were deployed at the school for the entirety of the school year, although they were unable to prevent incidents of violence against the group inside.

As a result of the subsequent closing of Little Rock's high schools during the 1958-1959 school year, Roberts completed his senior year at Los Angeles High School in Los Angeles, California, where his father's family lived. He then attended the University of California, Los Angeles (UCLA) and Los Angeles City College (LACC) before graduating from California State College.

== College and later life ==
Roberts continued his education at California State University, Los Angeles and graduated with a Bachelor of Arts degree in sociology in 1967. He received his master's degree in social welfare from the UCLA School of Social Welfare in 1970, and his Ph.D. in psychology from Southern Illinois University, Carbondale, in 1976.

From 1975 to 1977 he was a member of the faculty at Pacific Union College, a Seventh-day Adventist liberal arts college in Napa Valley, California. From 1977 - 1985, Roberts was director of mental health services at St. Helena Hospital and Health Center. From 1985 to 1993 he was Assistant Dean in the UCLA School of Social Welfare.

Roberts joined the Antioch University Los Angeles in 1993 and served as core faculty and co-chair of the Master of Arts in Psychology program, before retiring in 2008. Roberts left the Seventh-day Adventist Church in 1994. In addition, he is CEO of the management-consulting firm, Terrence Roberts Consulting.

Terrence Roberts was prominently featured on interviews and videos during the day Barack Obama was inaugurated as the 44th President of the United States of America.

Roberts published his memoir Lessons From Little Rock in 2009. A second book, Simple, Not Easy, was published in 2010.

== Media portrayals ==
In 1993, actor Suli McCullough portrayed Roberts in the Disney Channel movie The Ernest Green Story.

== See also ==
- Little Rock Nine
