= Virgil Blossom =

American educator

Virgil T. Blossom (1906 – 1965) was an American educator.

Blossom is best known for his time in Little Rock, Arkansas as Superintendent of Schools (1953–1958) during the Little Rock Crisis. In 1955, after the Supreme Court ruled in Brown v. Board of Education (1954) that American public schools must be integrated, Blossom developed a plan for gradual integration that was put into effect in 1957, despite opposition from Arkansas Governor Orval Faubus. Blossom was removed from office in 1958 when most of the Little Rock Board of Education resigned and the Arkansas state government closed the schools. After a short stay in New York, he moved to San Antonio, Texas to continue his career in education. He founded North East Independent School District, the first school never to be segregated.

== Career ==
Upon graduation, Blossom moved to Fayetteville, Arkansas to teach and coach at Fayetteville High School. He became principal of the school in 1938, while enrolled at the University of Arkansas and pursuing a master's degree. He received a master's from UA in 1939. In 1942, he was promoted to superintendent of Fayetteville Public Schools, at age 36.

=== Little Rock School District ===
Virgil T. Blossom was the superintendent of the Little Rock School District from 1953 to 1958. Blossom moved to Little Rock in 1953, becoming superintendent. After the Supreme Court ruled in favor of Linda Brown in the case of Brown v. Board of Education in 1954, Blossom established the plan for gradual integration for the Little Rock school district. After the first year of integration at the Little Rock Central High School, Virgil was removed from office, and the Central High School was closed down for a year. After the schools closed down he moved to San Antonio, Texas and opened the first ever school that had never been segregated.

Virgil Blossom created the Blossom Plan, the structure for the Integration of Little Rock High. After the Brown v. Board of Education case, where the courts ruled in favor of Integration, the Little Rock Board of Education released a statement saying it would "comply with the Court's decision, once the court outlined the method and time frame for implementation." The Board chose the superintendent Virgil Blossom to formulate the plan. In May 1955 the board adopted his plan, and named it the Blossom Plan. The original plan was to start the integration at the elementary schools, but as more elementary school parents spoke their opinions the plan was altered to begin integration in the fall of 1957 at Central High School, then to the junior high by 1960 and to the elementary level by 1963. The plan also included that any student whose race was a minority in their school could ask for a transfer. Despite the plan General Faubus called the National Guard to turn students away from the school. On February 8, 1956 the court made the Blossom plan a "court mandated operation," and it was carried out with the help of President Eisenhower. Virgil Blossom received numerous death threats and promises to put him out of work during his term as the superintendent.

Blossom wrote about his experiences in Little Rock, first as a series of articles in The Saturday Evening Post and subsequently in a memoir titled It Has Happened Here (1959).

== Personal life ==
Blossom married Clarrene Thomas Tribble on August 2, 1934. The couple had two children, Bettie Sue (born 1938), and Gail (born 1940). While in Fayetteville, Blossom was a member of the Lions Club, Freemasons, Consistory, and Knights Templar, as well as the Fayetteville Chamber of Commerce.

== See also ==
- Little Rock Nine
- Little Rock Central High School
