= Jefferson Thomas =

Member of the Little Rock Nine (1942–2010)

- Thomas in 1957
- Born: Jefferson Allison Thomas; September 19, 1942; Little Rock, Arkansas, U.S.
- Died: September 5, 2010 (aged 67); Columbus, Ohio, U.S
- Education: Wayne State University; Los Angeles State College
- Movement: Civil rights movement
- Spouse: Mary Thomas
- Awards: Congressional Gold Medal; Spingarn Medal

Jefferson Allison Thomas (September 19, 1942 – September 5, 2010) was one of the Little Rock Nine, a group of African-American students who, in 1957, were the first black students ever to attend classes at Little Rock Central High School in Little Rock, Arkansas. In 1999, Thomas and the other students of the Little Rock Nine were awarded the Congressional Gold Medal by President Bill Clinton.

== Early life and education ==
Jefferson Thomas, the youngest of seven children, was born in Little Rock to Mr. and Mrs. Ellis Thomas. His parents named him after Thomas Jefferson, President of the United States. Thomas first attended Horace Mann High School, a segregated all-black school, where he was a track athlete. In 1957, he volunteered to be among the first group of black students to integrate all-white Little Rock Central High School for the 1957–58 school year as a sophomore.

On September 4, 1957, the Little Rock Nine made an unsuccessful attempt to enter Central High School, which had been segregated. The Arkansas National Guard, under orders from the governor, and an angry mob of about 400 surrounded the school and prevented them from going in. On September 23, 1957, a mob of about 1000 people surrounded the school again as the students attempted to enter. The following day, President Dwight D. Eisenhower took control of the Arkansas National Guard from the governor and sent federal troops to accompany the students to school for protection. Both federal troops and federalized National Guard soldiers were deployed at the school for the entirety of the school year.

== Career ==
Despite the harassment Thomas graduated from Central High School in May 1960, and entered Wayne State University, Detroit. In mid-1961, he relocated to Los Angeles, California. He served as Treasurer of the NAACP Youth Council and State President of the Progressive Baptist Youth Convention. He also attended Los Angeles State College, joined the Student Government, and was elected President of the Associated Engineers. He obtained a bachelor's degree in Business Administration. Thomas also served in the U.S. Army's 9th Infantry Division as an infantryman during the Vietnam War.

== Later life ==
Thomas narrated the United States Information Agency's 1964 film Nine from Little Rock. In the film Thomas said, "If Little Rock taught us nothing more, it taught us that problems can make us better. Much better." The goal of this government film, in the context of the Cold War, was to show, to countries concerned about American racism, the progress the United States had made with respect to civil rights. It achieved this goal at least in part as the film received wide acclaim (including an Academy Award) and was distributed to 97 countries.

Thomas resided in Columbus, Ohio with his wife, Mary. He served as a volunteer mentor in the Village to Child Program co-sponsored by Ohio Dominican University, where he received his Honorary Degree, "Doctor of Humane Letters", on May 13, 2001, for his lifelong efforts in human rights and equality advancement.

Thomas was a frequent speaker at numerous high schools, colleges and universities throughout the country. He was the recipient of numerous awards from local and federal governmental agencies which include the Congressional Gold Medal awarded to the Little Rock Nine by President Bill Clinton in 1999. Also, in 1999, he and the other members of the Little Rock Nine received the NAACP's prestigious Spingarn Award "for their bravery and heroism throughout Central High's first year of integration". In August 2005, the State of Arkansas honored the Little Rock Nine with statues of their likeness on the Capitol grounds.

After more than 27 years as a civil servant, Thomas retired on September 30, 2004, from the Defense Finance and Accounting Service in Columbus, Ohio. In his later years, he served on the board of directors for the City of Refuge Learning Academy at the First Church of God.

Thomas died from pancreatic cancer in Columbus, Ohio, at age 67. He was the first member of the Little Rock Nine to have died. After a funeral in Columbus, he was interred at Forest Lawn Memorial Park in Glendale, California.

== Media portrayals ==
In 1993, actor Tico Wells portrayed Thomas in the Disney Channel movie The Ernest Green Story.

== See also ==
- Nine from Little Rock Jefferson Thomas of the Little Rock Nine
