= Melba Pattillo Beals =

American journalist and college educator

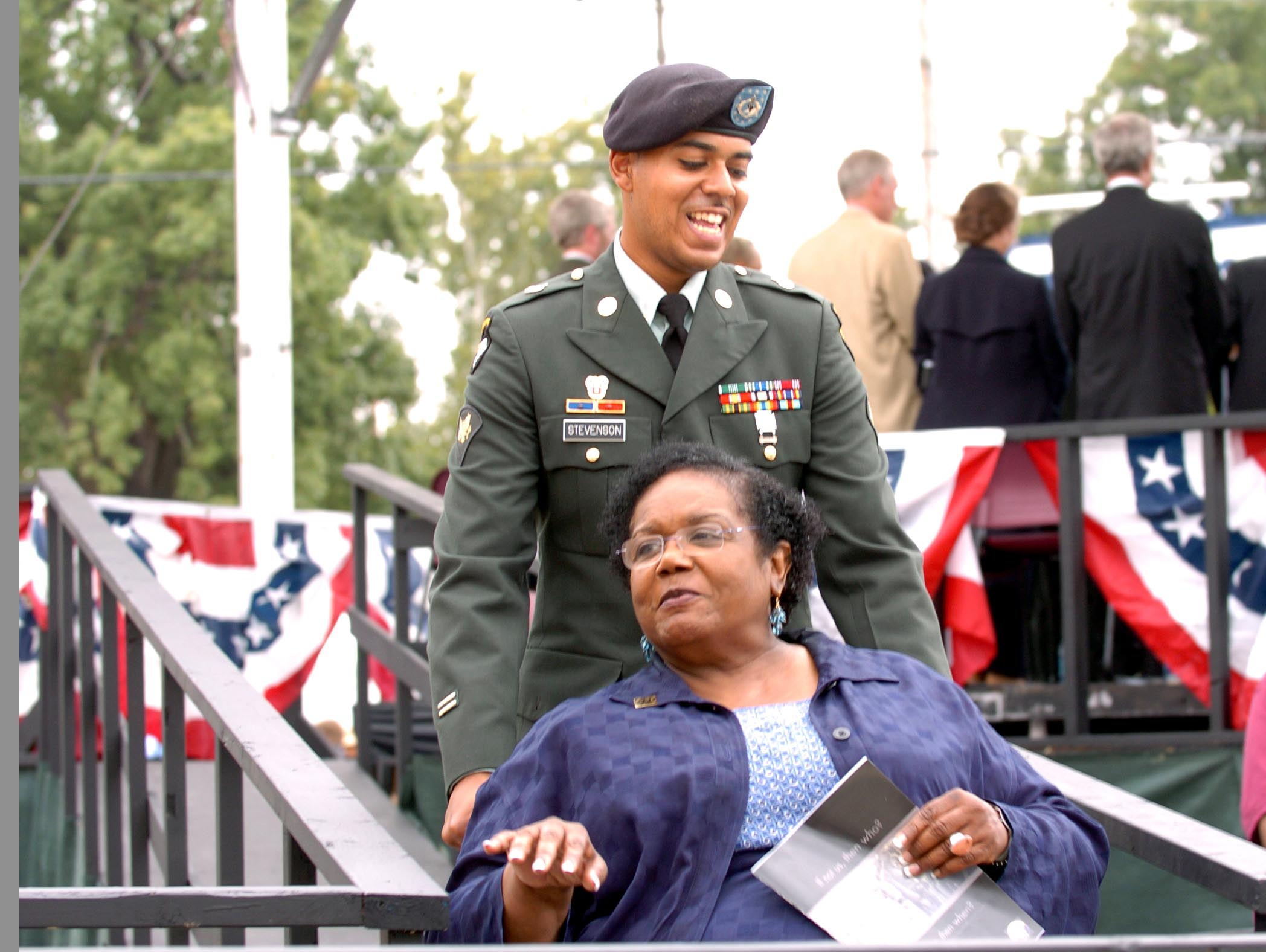
- Born: Melba Joy Patillo; December 7, 1941 (age 84); Little Rock, Arkansas, U.S.
- Education: San Francisco State University (BA); Columbia University (MA); University of San Francisco (EdD)

Melba Joy Patillo Beals (née Pattillo; born December 7, 1941) is an American journalist and educator who was a member of the Little Rock Nine, a group of black students who were the first to racially integrate Little Rock Central High School in Little Rock, Arkansas.

== Early life and education ==
Born on December 7, 1941, Beals grew up in a family that prioritized education. Her mother, Lois Marie Pattillo, was one of the first black graduates of the University of Arkansas in 1954 who worked as a middle school English teacher. Her father, Howell Pattillo, worked for the Missouri Pacific Railroad. Beals' brother, Conrad S. Pattillo, served as U.S. Marshal of the Eastern District of Arkansas during the Clinton administration.

=== High school education ===
While attending Horace Mann High School in Little Rock, an all-black high school, Patillo became aware that she was not receiving the same quality education as her peers at Central High School. Patillo then volunteered to transfer to the all-white Central High School with eight other black students from Horace Mann and Dunbar Junior High School in Little Rock.

External videos
- “Interview with Melba Pattillo Beals" conducted for Eyes on the Prize. Discussion centers on her experiences as one of the "Little Rock Nine" who integrated Little Rock Central High School in 1957.

Beals was 15 years old when she chose to enroll at Central High school in May 1956. On Sept. 4, 1957, she and eight other students arrived at Central High School where they were met by Arkansas National Guard troops sent by the governor of Arkansas, Orval Faubus to block the students' entry to the school. The nine black students also faced mobs, threats and harassment and President Dwight D. Eisenhower sent the 101st Airborne Division to protect their lives. Beals and her family faced Beals planned on returning to Central High for the 1958–1959 school year, but Governor Faubus shut down all Little Rock high schools that failed to resist integration, leading to other school districts across the South to do the same or to shift funding to private schools to avoid integration. Not until August 1959 did Central High reopen on an integrated basis.

Beals relocated to Santa Rosa, California with help from the NAACP to complete her senior year of high school at Montgomery High School. Beals lived with the family of foster parents Dr. George and Carol McCabe. At the age of seventeen, she began writing for major newspapers and magazines.

=== College ===
Beals attended San Francisco State University, earning a bachelor's degree. She later earned a master's degree in journalism from Columbia University. On May 22, 2009, she received her Doctoral Degree in Education at the University of San Francisco. The day marked USF's 150th annual commencement ceremony.

== Career ==
Beals' book Warriors Don't Cry chronicles the events of 1957 during the Little Rock crisis, based partly on diaries she kept during the period. She also wrote White is a State of Mind, which begins where Warriors left off. To date, Warriors Don't Cry continues to be a #1 Amazon bestseller in the "Teen & Young Adult Nonfiction on Prejudice" genre.

In 1959, the NAACP awarded the Spingarn Medal to Beals and to the other members of the Little Rock Nine, together with civil rights leader Daisy Bates, who had advised the group during their struggles at Central High. In 1999, she and the rest of the Nine were awarded the highest civilian honor, the Congressional Gold Medal. Only three hundred others have received this.

She taught journalism at Dominican University of California, where she is the chair emeritus of the communications department.

She is a member of the Board of Directors of Arukah Animal International, an organization which aims to put an end to animal exploitation and suffering through advocacy, awareness, and the arts.

== Personal life ==
While in college, she met John Beals, who she later married. They had one daughter, Kelli, and later divorced. Around 1992, Beals adopted twin sons, Matthew and Evan. Beals resides in the San Francisco Bay Area.
