= Gloria Ray Karlmark =

Member of the Little Rock Nine

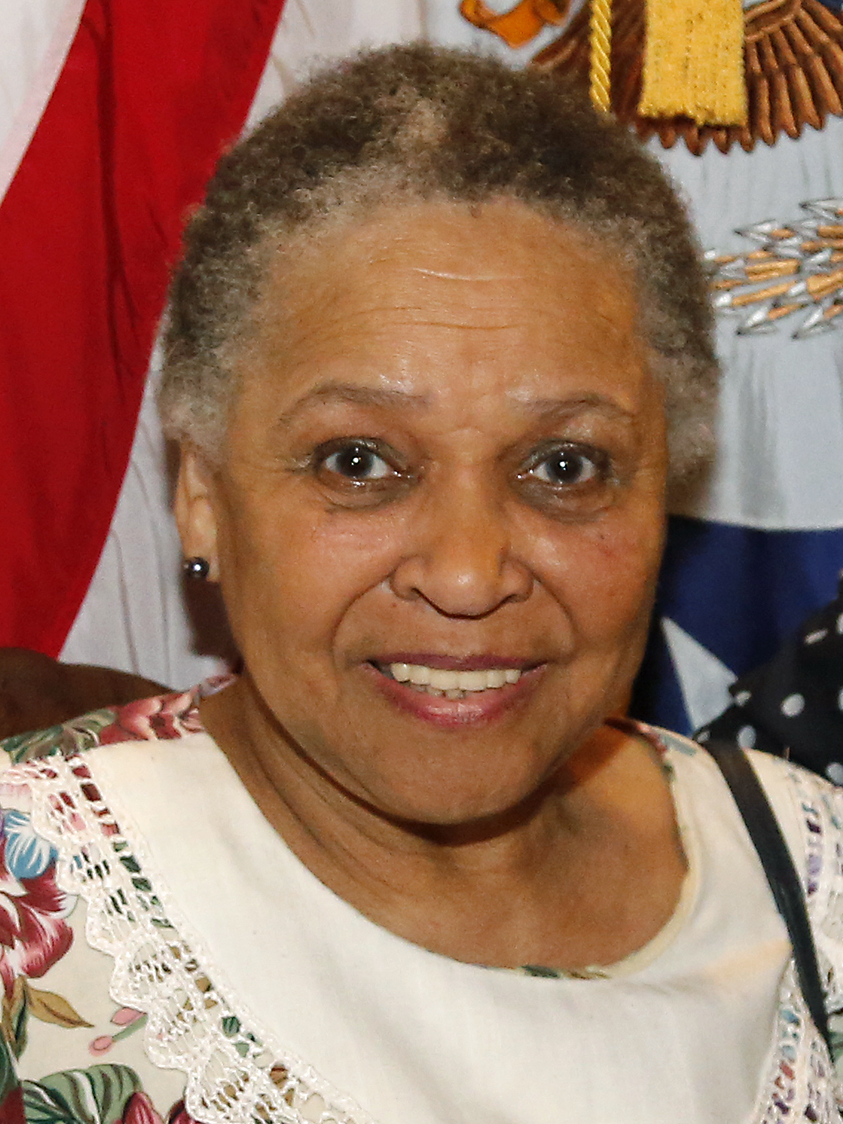
- Karlmark in 2018
- Born: Gloria Cecelia Ray; September 26, 1942 (age 84); Little Rock, Arkansas, U.S.
- Education: Illinois Institute of Technology (B.S. in Chemistry and Mathematics, 1965)
- Occupations: Chemist, educator, activist
- Known for: Member of the Little Rock Nine
- Spouse: Krister Karlmark (m. 1966)
- Children: 2
- Awards: Congressional Gold Medal (1999)

Gloria Cecelia Ray Karlmark (born September 26, 1942) is a member of the Little Rock Nine, the nine African-American students who desegregated Central High School in Little Rock, Arkansas in 1957. One of the three children of Harvey C. and Julia Miller Ray, she was 15 when she attempted to enter Little Rock Central High School where she was barred from entering by the Arkansas National Guard, under the order of Governor Orval Faubus who opposed integration. They returned to the school weeks later protected by federal troops.

In 1965, she graduated from the Illinois Institute of Technology with a bachelor's degree in Chemistry and Mathematics. She worked briefly as a public school teacher and research assistant at the University of Chicago Research Medical Center. Ray married Krister Karlmark in 1966, and in 1970, she joined International Business Machine's (IBM) Nordic Laboratory in Stockholm, Sweden, where she worked as a systems analyst and technical writer. In 1976 she cofounded the journal Computers in Industry, serving as the editor-in-chief until 1991.

Karlmark graduated from Kungliga Patent & Registreringsverket in Sweden as a patent attorney, and from 1977 until 1981, she worked for IBM International Patent Operations. From 1976 to 1994, Karlmark founded and was editor-in-chief of Computers in Industry, an international journal of computer applications in industry. In 1994, Karlmark went to work in the Netherlands for Philips Telecommunications in Hilversum and, later, for Philips Lighting in Eindhoven. She and her husband have two children. In 1998, Karlmark and the other members of the Little Rock Nine were awarded the Congressional Gold Medal in recognition of "selfless heroism."

In 1958, Karlmark and the Little Rock Nine received the Spingarn Medal by the National Association for the Advancement of Colored People (NAACP) for outstanding achievement by an African American.

Karlmark has noted concern about racism in the United States and now resides in Sweden and the Netherlands.

In 2019, Karlmark received an Honorary Doctorate of Science, for outstanding contributions to the development of a more inclusive society from the Illinois Institute of Technology.
