= Thelma Mothershed-Wair =

American activist (1940–2024)

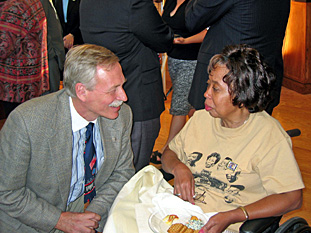
- Mothershed-Wair with Rep. Vic Snyder in 2005
- Born: Thelma Mothershed; November 29, 1940; Bloomburg, Texas, U.S.
- Died: October 19, 2024 (aged 83); Little Rock, Arkansas, U.S.
- Education: Little Rock Central High School
- Occupation: Teacher
- Known for: One of the Little Rock Nine
- Spouse: Fred Wair
- Children: 1
- Awards: Congressional Gold Medal (1999)

Thelma Mothershed-Wair (née Mothershed; November 29, 1940 – October 19, 2024) was an American activist who attended Little Rock's Central High School following the 1954 Brown vs. Board of Education court case. The Little Rock Nine was a group of nine African-American students enrolled in Little Rock Central High School in 1957. Their enrollment was followed by the Little Rock Crisis, in which the students were initially prevented from entering the racially segregated school by Orval Faubus, then Governor of Arkansas. They were able to attend due to the intervention of President Dwight D. Eisenhower.

== Early life ==
Thelma Mothershed was born in Bloomburg, Texas on November 29, 1940, the daughter of Arlevia and Hosanna Claire Mothershed. Mothershed had five siblings: three sisters and two brothers. She attended Dunbar Junior High and Horace Mann High schools, and despite daily torment from white students at Little Rock Central High School, she completed her junior year at the formerly all-white high school during the tumultuous 1957–58 year. Mothershed was a very successful student and was able to graduate from Central High in the 1958–59 school year after going out of her way to complete all the necessary credits in order to graduate on time.

== Little Rock Nine ==
The Little Rock Nine were a group of African-American students who began the integration, or the desegregation, of all white schools in Little Rock, Arkansas. When Governor Orval Faubus ordered the Arkansas National Guard to surround Little Rock Central High School to keep the nine students from entering the school, President Dwight D. Eisenhower ordered the 101st Airborne Division into Little Rock to insure the safety of the "Little Rock Nine". This group of brave students were tormented, ridiculed, harassed, and even assaulted daily for simply attending what would now be considered a regular public school. In an attempt to halt the desegregation of this school, a 'lost year' had occurred, leaving some students stranded unless they were able to take extra courses (like Mothershed did). This did not work, however, and a couple of the Little Rock Nine were still able to obtain their high school diplomas from this once all-white school. These original nine students eventually led the way to the desegregation of all public schools in the area.

Due to Little Rock's schools being closed the year following the Little Rock Nine students' integration, in order to earn the necessary credits for graduation she took correspondence courses and attended summer school in St. Louis, Missouri. She received her diploma from Central High School by mail.

== After Little Rock Nine ==
Mothershed attended Southern Illinois University Carbondale, where she studied home economics and became a member of the Alpha Kappa Alpha. After graduating in 1964 from SIU, she earned her master's degree in Guidance and Counseling and an Administrative Certificate in Education from Southern Illinois University Edwardsville in 1970 and 1972, respectively. Mothershed taught home economics in the East St. Louis School System for 28 years before retiring in 1994.

After receiving her degrees, Mothershed worked at the St. Clair County Jail, Juvenile Detention Center in St. Clair County, Illinois, and as an Instructor of Survival Skills for Women at an American Red Cross shelter.

== Personal life and death ==
Thelma Mothershed married Fred Wair on December 26, 1965, and became Thelma Mothershed-Wair. Fred Wair was born on October 6, 1939, and died at age 65 on May 25, 2005, in Cahokia, Illinois. Thelma and Fred had one son, Scott, and two grandchildren. Mothershed-Wair moved back to the Little Rock area in 2003, residing in her hometown until her death from complications of multiple sclerosis, on October 19, 2024, at the age of 83.

== Awards and recognition ==
In 1958, she received the Spingarn Medal from the National Association for the Advancement of Colored People (NAACP) for outstanding achievement.

During the 1989–90 school year she was honored as an Outstanding Role Model by the East St. Louis Chapter of the Top Ladies of Distinction and the Early Childhood–Pre-Kindergarten staff of District 189. She also received the National Humanitarian Award, the highest award given at the 2005 National Convention of Top Ladies of Distinction, Inc. held in Chicago.

In 1998, Mothershed received the Congressional Gold Medal.

She received an Honorary Doctor of Humane Letters from Southern Illinois University Edwardsville in 2016. "Ms. Wair exemplifies and lives SIUE’s values of wisdom, citizenship, integrity, excellence and inclusion," SIUE Interim Chancellor Stephen Hansen said. "While SIUE provided her with an education, she in turn taught all of us about courage, justice and dignity."
