= Vivion =

Vivion is a given name. Notable people with the name include:

- Vivion Brewer (1900–1991), American desegregationist
- Vivion de Valera (1910–1982), Irish politician, businessman, and lawyer

== See also ==
- Vivian (name)
- Vivion group
