= Brownie Ledbetter =

American activist (1932–2010)

- Born: April 28, 1932; Little Rock, Arkansas
- Died: March 21, 2010
- Occupation: Political activist

Mary Brown Williams Ledbetter (April 28, 1932 – March 21, 2010), better known as Brownie Ledbetter, was a political activist, social justice crusader and lobbyist who was involved in the civil rights, feminist, labor and environmental movements in Arkansas, United States and abroad.

== Early life ==
Ledbetter was born in Little Rock, Arkansas on April 28, 1932. The first of four children born to William H. Williams (dairy farmer) and Helon Brown Williams (homemaker), the family lived on the Tall Timber Jersey Farm. As a young child she was given the nickname Brownie as a descriptive of her brown eyes. Her mother died in 1947, and her father in 1950 leaving Ledbetter and her three siblings in the care of her aunt and uncle Grainger and Frances Williams.

She attended and graduated from Little Rock Central High School, which would later be the locus of her first involvement in political activism. From 1950 to 1953 Ledbetter attended Agnes Scott College in Decatur, Georgia. She was married on July 26, 1953, to Dr. Calvin Ledbetter, Jr., an attorney who would later become a political science professor at the University of Arkansas at Little Rock. The couple lived for two years in Germany where Ledbetter's husband was stationed with the U.S. Army Judge Advocate Corps. Ledbetter and her husband eventually settled down in Arkansas and had three children.

== Political career ==
Ledbetter had a long, dedicated and varied career. Bill Kopsky, executive director of the Arkansas Public Policy Panel said of her : "Brownie was an innovator in that she created a model for public policy work based on helping people find common ground, even when they were unaccustomed to working with each other. Her ability to establish a rapport with anyone was legendary, and she used that ability to bring people to the table in the hopes of finding common ground and common goals. First and foremost, she was a bridge builder," and "She really believed strongly in respecting where people were coming from and bringing them together to create common ground and use that common ground to create change."

=== Desegregation and grassroots support ===
Ledbetter became politically active around the time the Little Rock Integration Crisis of 1957, after nine African-American students were barred from entering her alma mater, Little Rock Central High School by a blockade of the Arkansas National Guard under the direction of Governor Orval Faubus. She joined the work begun by Adolphine Fletcher Terry, Sara Murphy, and Vivion Brewer in the Women's Emergency Committee to Open Our Schools (WEC), an advocacy group.

After the WEC dissolved in 1963, Ledbetter went on to work with the Little Rock Panel of American Women which had been founded by Sarah Alderman Murphy. The panel provided a structured forum for open discussion about racial, religious and cultural difference. Moderated by Ledbetter, the participants shared their personal experiences in a bridge building exercise with the communities they visited in an effort to broaden the discussion and reduce opposition to desegregation. Later, the panel would also develop programs enabling students in fighting discrimination, and provide human-relations training for teachers.

In 1981, the panel evolved into the Arkansas Public Policy Panel and Ledbetter served as its executive director until her retirement in 1999. Under her leadership, the panel served the interests of agriculture, civil rights, economic justice and development, education, environment, and government and corporate accountability. The panel also expanded the local voice in matters of public policy by training grassroots organizations, community leaders, and city lobbyists, sixty of which were personally trained by Ledbetter.

=== Women’s movement and ERA ===
In addition to her work on economic and cultural justice, Ledbetter was an outspoken feminist and a vocal participant in the women's movement. She was a strong supporter of the ERA and was an organizing member of the ERA/Arkansas Coalition. She was called to be part of President Jimmy Carter's National Commission on Women and served as an executive board member of the Women's Environmental Development Organization (WEDO), a group that lobbies the United Nation on women's issues. She was organizer of the first Planned Parenthood Affiliate and clinic in Arkansas, and she led the campaign to defeat the first ballot effort to prohibit abortion rights for women. She was also involved in several non-governmental international organizations: Grassroots Organizations Operating Together in Sisterhood, WEDO, and US Women Connect.

=== Other career highlights ===
- Arkansas State Central Democratic Committee (1968–1974)
- Arkansas Women's Political Caucus (founding member)
- National Women's Political Caucus (Political Action Chair, 1973)
- Arkansas State Democratic Party (Affirmative Action Committee Coordinator, 1973–1974)
- ERA/Arkansas Coalition (organizing member, 1973–1978),
- Southern Coalition for Educational Equity (state director, 1982–1985)
- Arkansas Fairness Council (founder & president, 1983–1998)
- Arkansas Career Resources, Inc. (founder and executive director, 1985–1990)
- Arkansas State Advisory Committee to the U.S. Commission on Civil Rights
- American Civil Liberties Union of Arkansas (board member)
- State Federation of Business and Professional Women (legislative director)
- Women's Environment and Development Organization (co-founder with Bella Abzug)
- National Congress of Neighborhood Women
- National Commission on Women
- Grassroots Organizations Operating Together in Sisterhood
- Women's Environmental Development Organization (executive board member)
- US Women Connect.
- Women USA Fund
- Arkansas Citizen's First Congress (founder)
- Community Advocates for Public Education

=== Campaign work ===
Ledbetter also acted as an organizer and consultant in many political campaigns. Among them, she was the campaign manager for her husband's successful run to stand for the Arkansas General Assembly. She was herself a delegate to the National Democratic Convention in 1968. She also managed the McGovern campaign for the state of Arkansas in 1972.

== Death ==
Ledbetter died at her home in Little Rock on March 21, 2010, six months after she had been diagnosed with a brain tumour. Upon her death, United States Secretary of State Hillary Clinton eulogized that Ledbetter was “a fierce champion for women’s rights, civil rights, and the right of all Americans to education and opportunity. Brownie… was one of those tireless citizen activists who set out to improve their community and end up helping change the world. She began as a concerned volunteer in the struggle to desegregate the schools of Little Rock, and became an accomplished advocate for the rights of Arkansans and people everywhere.”

== Honors and awards ==
- American Civil Liberties Union Civil Libertarian of the Year in (1992)
- Mary Hatwood Futrell Award from the National Education Association in (2005)
