= Arkansas lunar sample displays =

The Arkansas lunar sample displays are two commemorative plaques consisting of small fragments of Moon specimen brought back with the Apollo 11 and Apollo 17 lunar missions and given in the 1970s to the people of the state of Arkansas by United States President Richard Nixon as goodwill gifts.

== Description ==
=== Apollo 11 ===
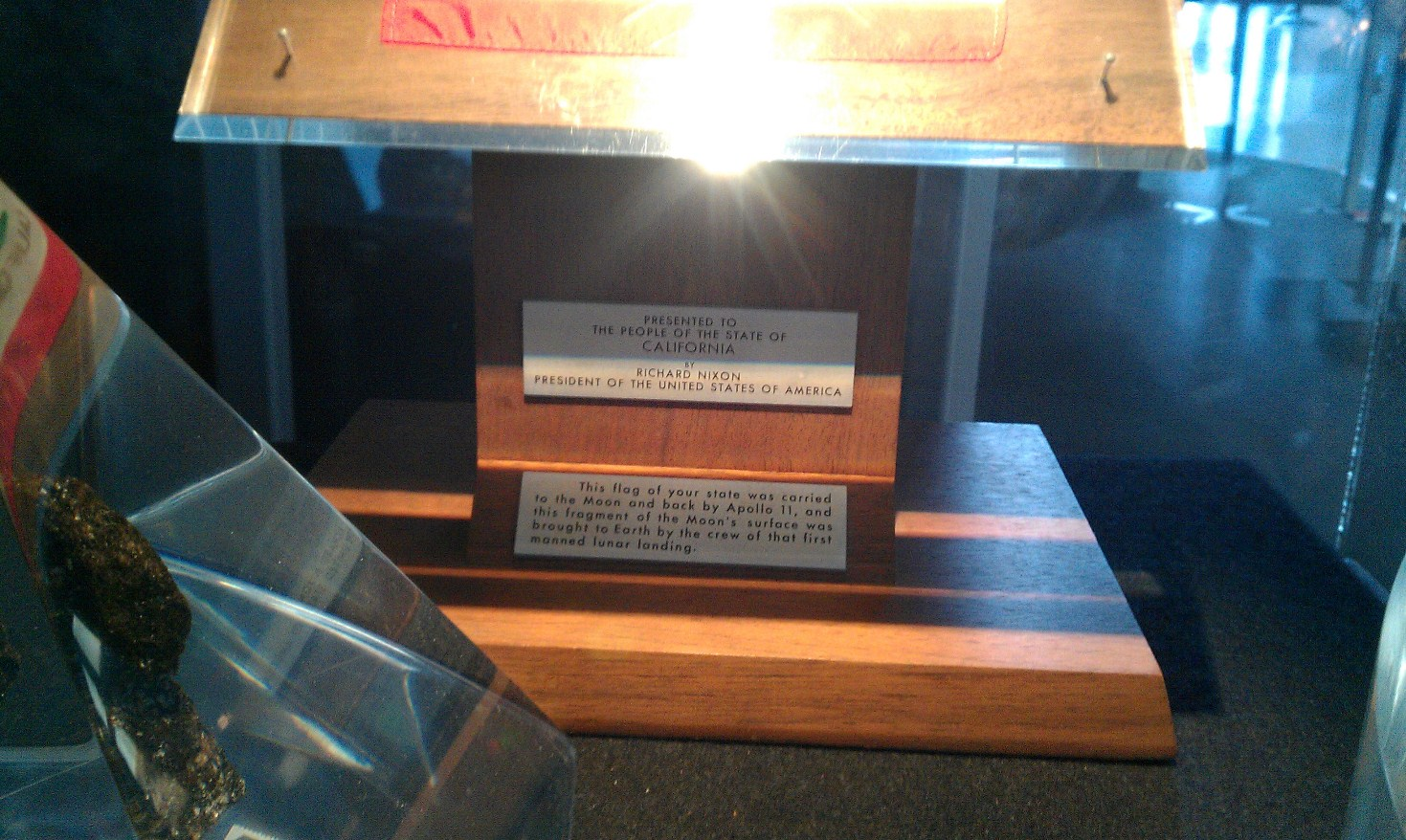
Plaques on the California Apollo 11 lunar sample display, similar to the display in Arkansas

At the request of Nixon, NASA had about 250 presentation plaques made following Apollo 11 in 1969. Each included about four rice-sized particles of Moon dust from the mission totaling about 50 mg. The Apollo 11 lunar sample display has an acrylic plastic button containing the Moon dust mounted with the recipient's country or state flag that had been to the Moon and back. All 135 countries received the display, as did the 50 states of the United States and the U.S. provinces and the United Nations.

The plaques were given as gifts by Nixon in 1970.

=== Apollo 17 ===
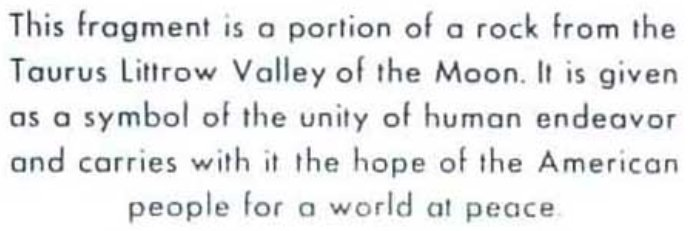
Message on Apollo 17 plaque

The sample Moon rock collected during the Apollo 17 mission was later named lunar basalt 70017, and dubbed the Goodwill rock. Pieces of the rock weighing about 1.14 grams were placed inside a piece of acrylic lucite, and mounted, along with a flag of the country which would receive it, that had flown on Apollo 17.

In 1973 Nixon had the plaques sent to 135 countries, and to the United States with its territories, as a goodwill gesture.

== History ==
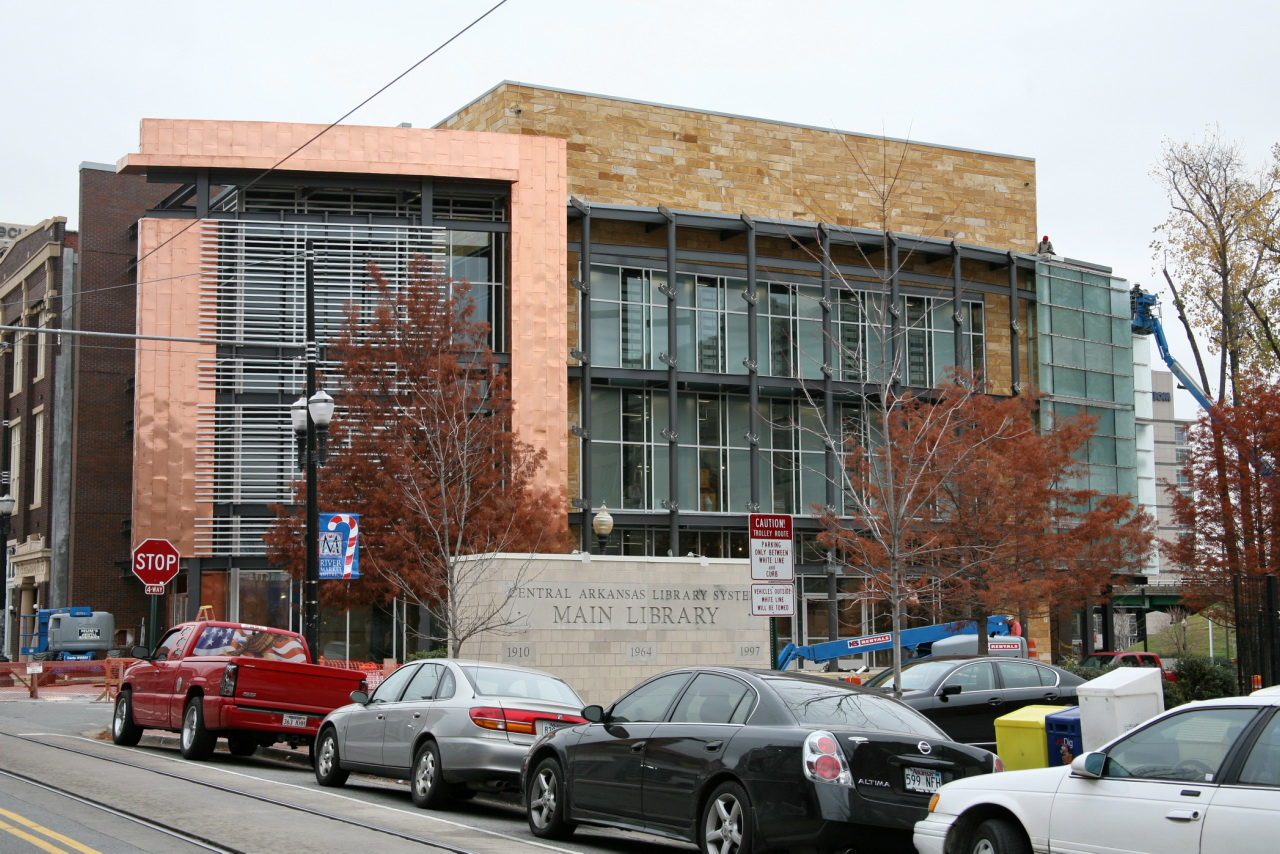
Central Arkansas Library containing the Butler Center for Arkansas Studies

In 1976, the Arkansas Apollo 17 lunar sample display was presented to Arkansas governor David Pryor; Bill Clinton succeeded Pryor as Governor of Arkansas. Valued at several million dollars, the display was reported missing around 1980. It was rediscovered in 2011 by an archivist, according to the director of the Central Arkansas Library System. The archivist found it in a box of Clinton's gubernatorial materials in the basement of the Butler Center for Arkansas Studies in Little Rock. The plastic ball container holding the Moon rock was broken off in a box of Clinton's gubernatorial materials. (It has since been reattached.) It was turned over for display at the Arkansas Museum of Discovery in Little Rock.

According to Moon rocks researcher Robert Pearlman, the Arkansas Apollo 11 lunar sample display is also housed at the Arkansas Museum of Discovery.

== See also ==
- List of Apollo lunar sample displays
