= Central Arkansas (disambiguation) =

Central Arkansas is a metropolitan statistical area of the U.S. state of Arkansas.

Central Arkansas may also refer to:

- University of Central Arkansas, a public university located in Conway, a city within the aforementioned metropolitan area
- Central Arkansas Bears and Sugar Bears, that university's athletics program
- Central Arkansas Library System, a public library system headquartered in Little Rock, Arkansas, United States
- Central Arkansas Christian Schools, a group of private schools based in North Little Rock, Arkansas, United States
