= Little Rock Central High School =

School and historic site in Arkansas, US

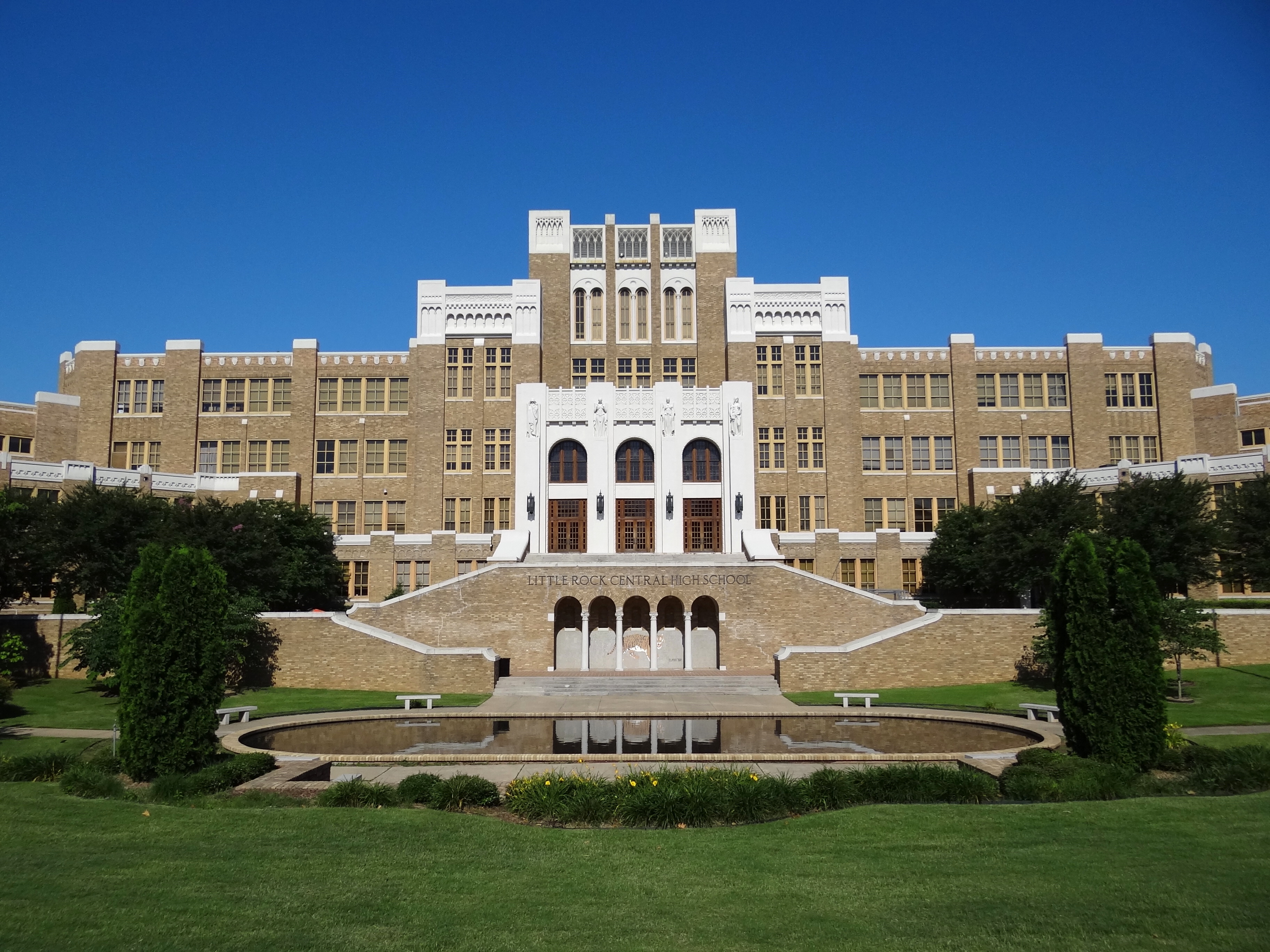
- Front entrance to Little Rock Central High School

Location
- 1500 Little Rock Nine Way; Little Rock, Arkansas 72202-5843; United States

Information
- School type: Comprehensive public high school
- Founded: 1927 (99 years ago)
- Status: Open
- School district: Little Rock School District
- NCES District ID: 0509000
- Superintendent: Dr. Jermall D. Wright
- CEEB code: 041422
- NCES School ID: 050900000607
- Principal: April Rike
- Teaching staff: 161.18 (on FTE basis)
- Grades: 9–12
- Enrollment: 2,260 (2023–2024)
- Student to teacher ratio: 14.02
- Education system: Arkansas Smart Core Curriculum; Little Rock Scholars; International Studies Career Focus; Environmental Science Magnet/Career Focus; Information Science Magnet/Career Focus; Systems Engineering Magnet/Career Focus
- Classes offered: Regular, Career Focus, Advanced Placement
- Hours in school day: 7.25
- Campus size: 18 acres (7.3 ha)
- Colors: Black and Old gold
- Fight song: Fight 'Em Tigers! (based on On, Wisconsin!)
- Athletics conference: 7A/6A East (2012–14)
- Team name: Tigers
- Rival: Little Rock Southwest high school, Cabot high school
- Accreditation: ADE; AdvancED (1924–)
- Publication: The Labyrinth
- Newspaper: The Tiger
- Yearbook: The Pix
- Communities served: Little Rock
- Website: www.lrcentralhigh.net//
- Little Rock Central High School
- U.S. National Register of Historic Places
- U.S. National Historic Landmark
- U.S. Historic district – Contributing property
- U.S. National Historic Site
- Location within Arkansas Location within the United States
- Location: Little Rock, Arkansas
- Coordinates: 34°44′12″N 92°17′56″W
- Area: 17.95 acres (7.26 ha)
- Architect: Parks Almand, John
- Architectural style: Gothic Revival
- Visitation: 44,293 (2005)
- Website: Little Rock Central High School National Historic Site
- Part of: Central High School Neighborhood Historic District (ID96000892)
- NRHP reference No.: 77000268 (original), 01000274 (National Historic Site)

Significant dates
- Added to NRHP: August 19, 1977
- Designated NHL: May 20, 1982
- Designated CP: August 16, 1996
- Designated NHS: November 6, 1998

Little Rock Central High School (LRCH) is an accredited comprehensive public high school in Little Rock, Arkansas, United States. The school was the site of the Little Rock Crisis in 1957 after the U.S. Supreme Court ruled that segregation by race in public schools was unconstitutional three years earlier. This was during the period of heightened activism in the civil rights movement.

Central is located at the intersection of Little Rock Nine Way (a section of Park Street, designated in September 2022) and Daisy L. Gatson Bates Drive (formerly 14th Street). Bates was an African-American journalist and state NAACP president who played a key role in bringing about, through the 1957 crisis, the integration of the school.

Central can trace its origins to 1869 when the Sherman School operated in a wooden structure at 8th and Sherman streets; it graduated its first class on June 13, 1873. In 1885 the Sherman School was moved to 14th and Scott streets and was named Scott Street School, but was more commonly called City High School. Five years later in 1890, the Peabody School was constructed at West Capitol and Gaines streets. It was named in honor of philanthropist George Peabody from US$200,000 received via the Peabody Education Fund. In 1905, the city founded Little Rock High School at the intersection of 14th and Cumberland streets, and shuttered the Peabody and Scott Street schools to serve as the city's sole public high school. Until 1957, only white students were permitted to be enrolled.

In 1927 at a cost of US$1.5 million, the city completed construction on the nation's largest and most expensive high school facility, which remains in use today. In 1953 with the construction of Hall High School, the school was renamed as Little Rock Central High School. It has since been listed on the U.S. National Register of Historic Places and named as a U.S. National Historic Landmark and National Historic Site.

Central High School, which covers grades 9 through 12, had an enrollment of 2,476 in school year 2020–2021. It is in the Little Rock School District, and serves sections of Little Rock and the entirety of Cammack Village. Nancy Rousseau was appointed principal in 2002, and retained that position as of 2024.

== History ==
=== Early campus history ===
Built in 1927 at a cost of $1.5 million, Little Rock Senior High School was designed in the Gothic Revival style; it was hailed as the most expensive, most beautiful, and largest high school in the nation. Statues of four figures over the front entrance represent ambition, personality, opportunity, and preparation. Its opening earned national publicity, with nearly 20,000 people attending the dedication ceremony. In 1953 it was renamed as Little Rock Central High School.

At the time in Arkansas and other states across the South, public school educational facilities were legally racially segregated. In 1954 the US Supreme Court ruled in Brown v. Board of Education that such segregation in public schools was unconstitutional, and encouraged the states to integrate their schools. Related historic events in the 1950s changed education at Central High School and throughout the United States.

=== Little Rock integration ===
LRCHS was the focal point of the Little Rock Integration Crisis of 1957. Nine Black students, known as the Little Rock Nine, were denied entrance to the school in defiance of the 1954 U.S. Supreme Court ruling ordering integration of public schools. This provoked a showdown between the Democrat Governor Orval Faubus and Republican President Dwight D. Eisenhower that gained international attention.

On the morning of September 23, 1957, the nine Black high school students faced an angry mob of over 1,000 Whites in front of Central High School who were protesting the integration project. As the students were escorted inside by the Little Rock police, violence escalated, and they were removed from the school. The next day, Eisenhower ordered the 1,200-man 327th Airborne Battle Group of the U.S. Army's 101st Airborne Division from Fort Campbell, Kentucky, to escort the nine students into the school. By the same order, he federalized the entire 10,000-man Arkansas National Guard, in order to remove them from the control of Governor Faubus. At nearby Camp Robinson, a hastily organized Task Force 153rd Infantry drew guardsmen from units all over the state. Most of the Arkansas Guard was quickly demobilized, but the ad hoc Task Force 153rd Infantry assumed control at Thanksgiving when the 327th withdrew and patrolled inside and outside the school for the remainder of the school year. As Melba Pattillo Beals, one of the nine students, wrote in her diary, "After three full days inside Central [High School], I know that integration is a much bigger word than I thought."

This event, watched by the nation and world, was the site of the first important test for the implementation of the U.S. Supreme Court's Brown v. Board of Education decision of 1954. Many areas of the South pledged to resist this ruling. Arkansas' governor Orval Faubus questioned the authority of the federal court system and the validity of desegregation. The crisis at Little Rock's Central High School was the first fundamental test of the national resolve to enforce black civil rights in the face of massive resistance during the years following the Brown decision. As to whether Eisenhower's specific actions to enforce integration violated the Posse Comitatus Act, the Supreme Court, in Cooper v. Aaron (1958), indirectly affirmed the legality of his conduct. It was never expressly reviewed.

In 1958, federal Judge Jesse Smith Henley of the United States District Court for the Eastern District of Arkansas, stating that integration had "broken down under the pressure of public opinion," suspended operation of the federal integration order until the 1960–61 school term. The school board said that it had faced large fees and could not afford to hire security guards to keep the peace in school.

LRCHS was listed on the National Register of Historic Places on August 19, 1977, and was designated as a National Historic Landmark on May 20, 1982. The school continues to be used as an educational facility.

In 2007, Central High School held an event for the 50th Anniversary of the Little Rock Nine entering Central. On September 24, 2007, a new museum was opened honoring the Little Rock Nine. That same year, HBO produced a documentary film directed by the Renaud Brothers, Little Rock Central: 50 Years Later, which explored the significant changes and continuities within the school since its desegregation.

=== Teaching evolution ===
Little Rock Central High School made legal history again in 1968, in a case based on the teaching of evolution in the public schools. LRCHS biology teacher Susan Epperson agreed to be the plaintiff in a case challenging an Arkansas law forbidding the teaching of the theory of evolution by natural selection in the public schools. The United States Supreme Court's decision in Epperson v. Arkansas held that states could not require that "teaching and learning must be tailored to the principles or prohibitions of any religious sect or dogma," i.e., the teaching of evolution in schools could not be forbidden on religious grounds.

== After integration ==
Today, the high school is minority-majority, with a minority enrollment of 67.7%. The racial breakdown of the school in 2021 was 52.7% Black, 32.3% White, 8.1% Asian, 5.5% Hispanic, and 0.9% two or more races.

On February 4, 2026, students led a protest during a fire drill, part of the series of protests against the United States Immigration and Customs Enforcement (ICE) following the killings of Renée Good and Alex Pretti. In a statement, Principal Nancy Rousseau described the demonstration as "a short, peaceful, student-led expression." A student walkout was also organized that day at eStem High School.

== Academics ==
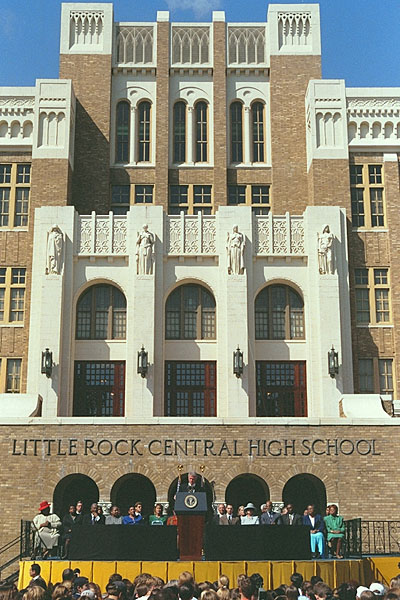
President Bill Clinton led celebrations of the 40th anniversary of desegregation at Little Rock Central High School.

The assumed course of study follows the Smart Core curriculum developed by the Arkansas Department of Education (ADE). For 2011–12, Central is in Whole School Improvement Year 4 in its work to reach Adequate Yearly Progress (AYP) toward the No Child Left Behind Act.

Central has an International Studies Magnet Program, an EAST Initiative Lab Program, more than 30 service, academic, and honors clubs, award-winning instrumental and concert band and choral programs, and more than 141 courses offered, including 35 AP and Pre-AP courses and 5 foreign languages.

=== Publications ===
Its student publications include The Tiger (the student newspaper), The Pix (the school yearbook), which was originally named The Cage, and The Labyrinth (the school poetry and arts magazine).

The Pix was inducted into the Arkansas Scholastic Press Association's Arkansas Yearbook Hall of Fame on April 16, 2010. The 2010–11 edition of the PIX received a Silver Medal from the Columbia Scholastic Press Association.

The Tiger is the official news publication of Little Rock Central High School and one of the oldest high school newspapers in the country. It is issued in the form of a quarterly mini-magazine that keeps students updated on issues around the school. The newspaper has won many Arkansas Scholastic Press Association awards. The periodical is known for covering difficult aspects of student life, including eating disorders, drug use, and academic dishonesty.

=== Awards and recognition ===
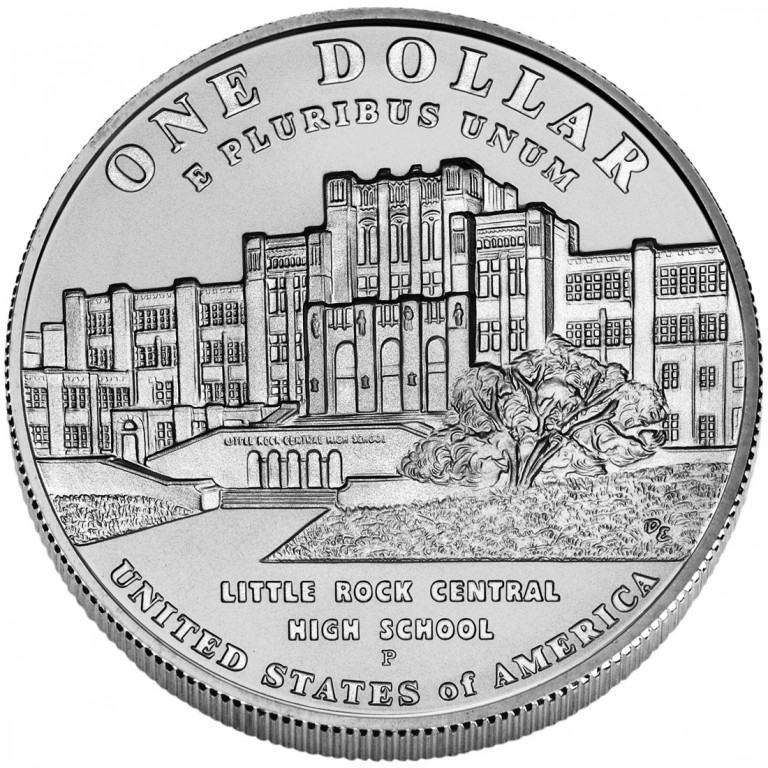
The reverse of the 2007 Little Rock Central High School Desegregation silver dollar, designed by Don Everhart

Central is a charter member and has been fully accredited by AdvancED since 1924. It has the oldest charter west of the Mississippi River in the Cum Laude Society.

As of 2008 Central has had the most National Merit and National Achievement finalists in the state over the past 10 years with over $4 million in scholarships awarded during the 2006–07 school year. Central has had five Presidential Scholars in the last decade and had 256 AP Scholars in 2020–21. The school dominates at regional and state Science Fairs. It has the largest number of delegates to Boys' and Girls' State, the most participants in Governor's School Gifted and Talented Program, and has competed in chemistry Olympiad, Arkansas Junior Science and Humanities Symposium, mock trial, various mathematics competitions, and the SECME Olympiad. In addition, Central has had 55 Stephens' Award winners for academic achievement.

The Drama and Competitive Speech program is competitive and became one of the charter chapters of the Arkansas district of the National Forensic League (speech and debate honor society).

The school's choir programs has garnered several Best in Class awards at the annual Arkansas State Choral Festival administered by the Arkansas Choral Directors Association (ArkCDA). In addition, educated Andrew Goldberg and Isaiah Bailey. In 2007, 2009, 2010, 2012, 2013, 2023, 2024, 2025, 2026 the Little Rock Central Madrigals won Class 7A Best in Class for Mixed Ensemble and Overall Ensemble. In 2023 and 2024 the Little Rock Central Concert Treble Chorus won Class 7A Best in Class for Medium Treble Chorus and in 2026 won 7A Best in Class for Large Treble Chorus. In 2026 the Little Rock Central Pointe Chorus won Class 7A Best in Class Medium Treble Chorus.

Since 2007, Central has been ranked nationally within the top 275 high schools based on the Challenge Index developed by The Washington Post. In Newsweek's June 13, 2010, issue, ranking the country's top high schools, Little Rock Central High School was ranked 94th in the nation, after having been ranked 20th in the magazine's 2006 rankings.

Little Rock Central High School won the National Fed Challenge competition in 2007 and again in 2008.

In 2008, Central was the Quiz bowl division 7A state champion.

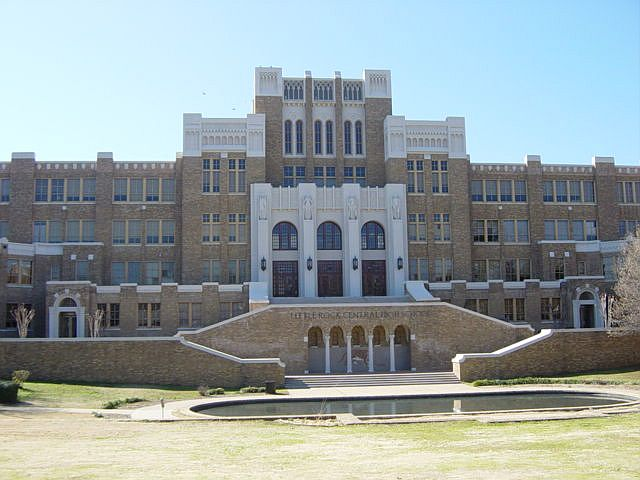
The Reflecting Pool was restored during the 2004–05 school year.

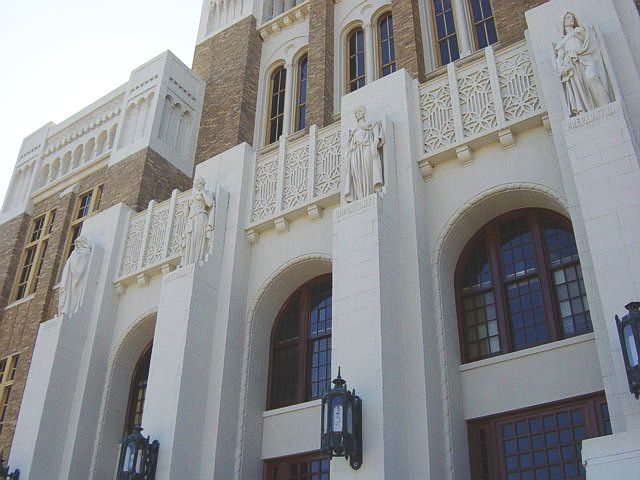
Detail of Front Entrance

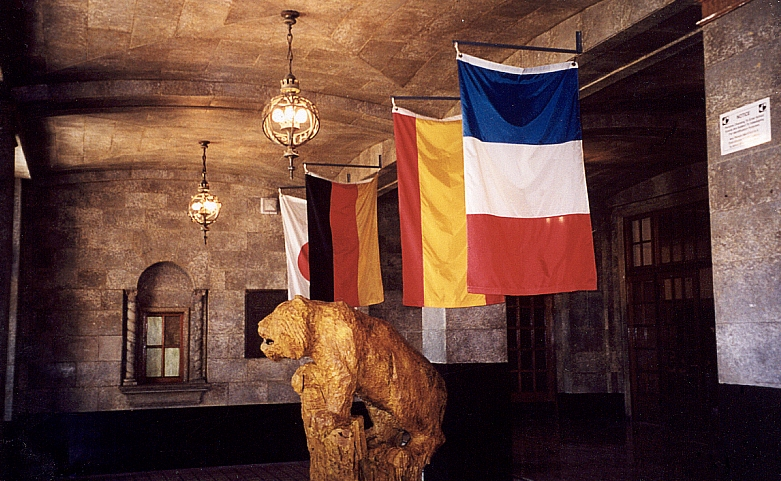
Entrance Hall

The Little Rock Central Band and Flag Line were selected to participate in the 2013 Presidential Inaugural Parade for Barack Obama.

== Extracurricular activities ==
The Little Rock Central High School mascot for academic and athletic teams is the Tiger, with black and old gold serving as the school colors. The school's fight song, "Fight 'Em Tigers!" is based on "On, Wisconsin!."

=== Athletics ===
The Little Rock Tigers compete in numerous interscholastic activities in the state's largest classification (7A) in the 7A/6A East Conference for 2012–14, as administered by the Arkansas Activities Association. The Tigers participate in baseball, basketball (boys/girls), bowling, competitive cheer, cross country, football, golf (boys/girls), soccer (boys/girls), softball, swimming & diving (boys/girls), tennis (boys/girls), track & field (boys/girls), volleyball, and wrestling.

Little Rock Central holds numerous team and individual national and state titles and records including:

- Football: 32 football state championship banners from 1907 through 2004 including the state's all-time win record. Since 1937, home football games are played at Quigley-Cox Stadium at Verizon Wireless Field, originally named for Earl Quigley, a coach for the Tigers from 1914 to 1935. The Tigers won the 1946 and 1957 High School Football National Championship.
- Cross country: 22 boys' cross country state championships from 1955 through 1982;
- Track and field: a national-record 50 track & field state championships (1908–1979) with an 18-year consecutive run of titles from 1926 through 1945, followed by a 10-year title winning streak between 1949 and 1958. Both streaks are listed in the national record books.
- Basketball: the boys basketball teams have won 20 state titles between 1912 and 2024, including four consecutive banners (1944–47) and three overall state titles (1972, 1973, 1975);
- Golf: The boys' golf team has won eight state titles between 1948 and 1982.
- Soccer: The girls' soccer team won consecutive state titles in 2002 and 2003.
- Swimming: The girls' swimming and diving team has won eight state titles since 1952 and the Men's swimming and diving team has won 3 state titles since 2018.
- Tennis: The tennis teams have won thirteen titles for the boys' team and seven titles for the girls' team.

== Feeder patterns ==
=== Elementary schools ===
Elementary schools that feed into Little Rock Central include:

- Booker
- Brady
- Carver
- Forest Park
- Fulbright
- Gibbs
- Jefferson
- King
- McDermott
- Pulaski Heights
- Rockefeller
- Romine
- Stephens
- Terry
- Washington
- Woodruff

=== Middle schools ===
Middle schools include:

- Cloverdale Magnet Middle School
- Dunbar Magnet Middle School
- Forest Heights Middle School
- Henderson Health Sciences Magnet Middle School
- Pulaski Heights Middle School

Magnet-only schools that matriculate many students to Central include Mann Arts and Science Magnet Middle School.

== Little Rock Central High School National Historic Site ==
On November 6, 1998, U.S. Congress established Little Rock Central High School National Historic Site. The National Historic Site is administered in partnership with the National Park Service, Little Rock Public Schools, the City of Little Rock, and others.

The visitor center for the site is located diagonally across the street from the school and across from the memorial dedicated by Michael Warrick, and opened in fall 2006. It contains a captioned interpretive film on the Little Rock integration crisis, as well as multimedia exhibits on both that and the larger context of desegregation during the 20th century and the Civil Rights Movement.

Opposite the visitor center to the west is the Central High Commemorative Garden, which features nine trees and benches that honor the students. Arches that represent the school's facade contain embedded photographs of the school in years since the crisis, and showcase students of various backgrounds in activities together.

Opposite the visitor center to the south is a historic Mobil gas station, which has been preserved in its appearance at the time of the crisis. At the time, it served as the area for the press and radio and television reporters. It later served as a temporary visitor center before the new one was built.

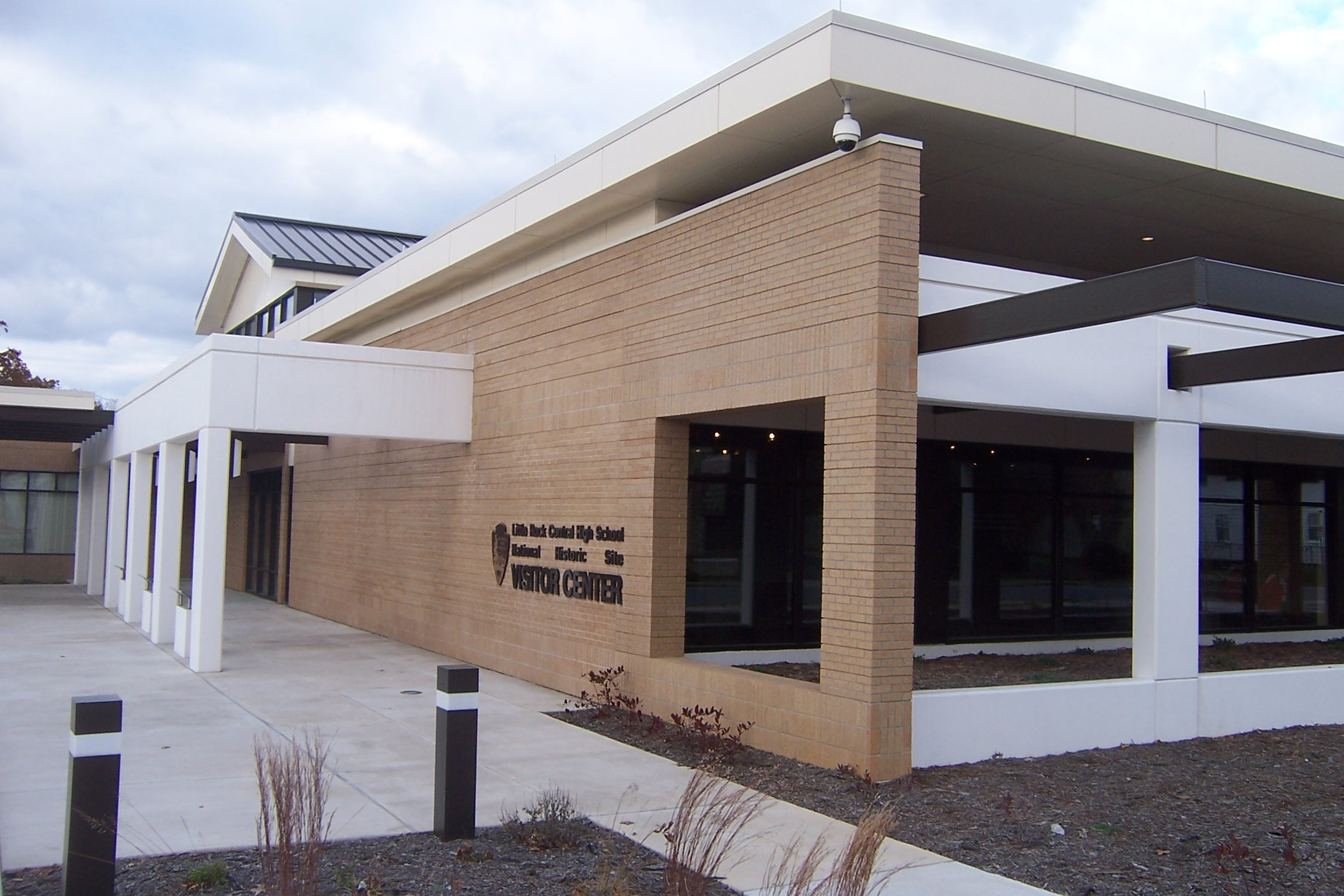
Visitor Center. Main building

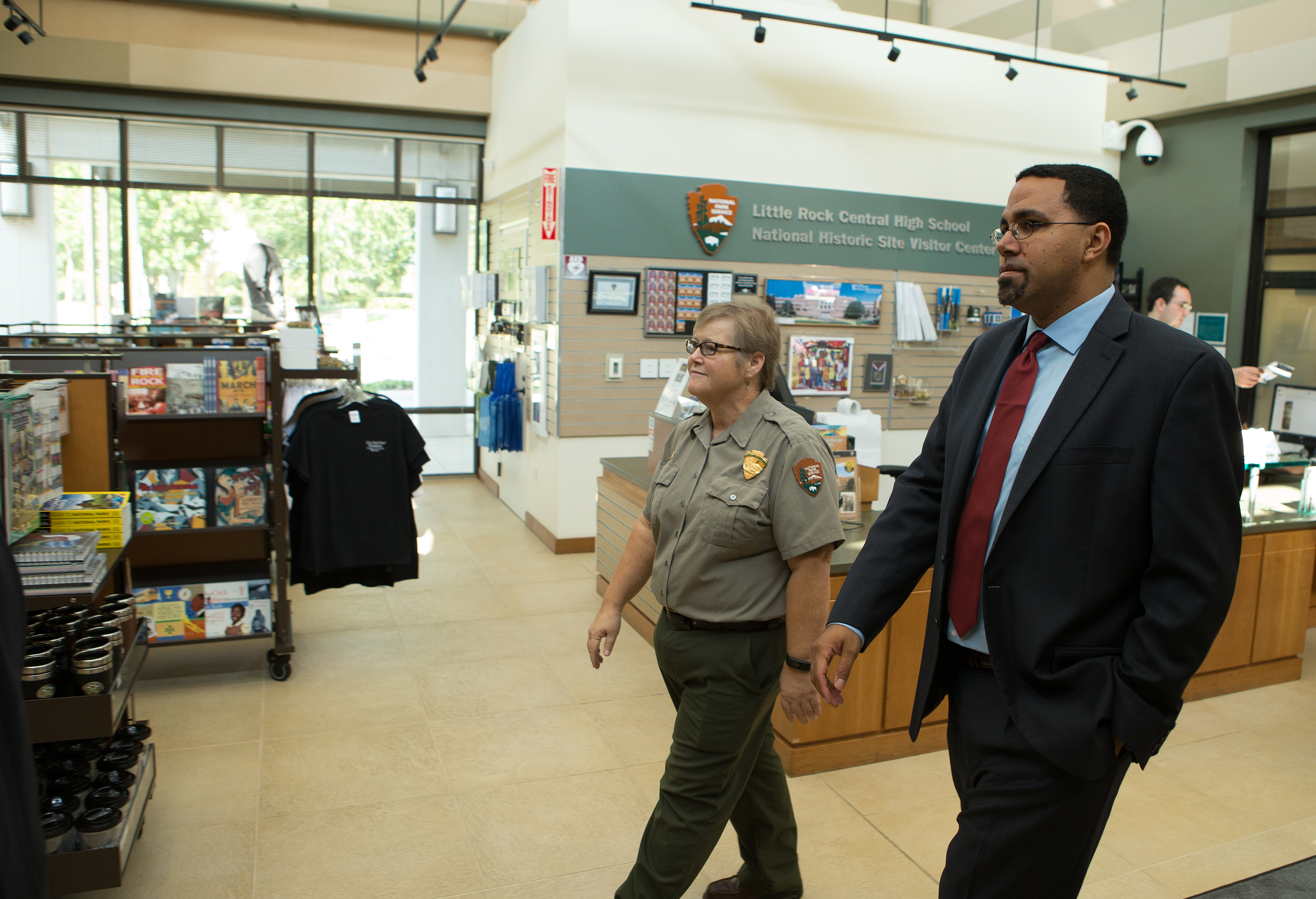
U.S. Secretary of Education John King Jr. at Little Rock Central High School National Historic Site in 2016

== Notable alumni ==
The following are notable people associated with Little Rock High School / Little Rock Central High School. If the person was a Central High School student, the number in parentheses indicates the year of graduation; if the person was a faculty or staff member, that person's title and years of association are included

=== Academia, public service, and politics ===
- Little Rock Nine (1958–60)—Eight of the nine original students of the 1957 Little Rock integration crisis.
  - Melba Pattillo Beals, one of the Little Rock Nine members
- Charles J. Blake (c. 2001)—Democratic member of the Arkansas House of Representatives for Pulaski County since 2015.
- Vivion Brewer (1917)—Political activist and chairwoman of the Women's Emergency Committee to Open Our Schools.
- Brownie Ledbetter (1950)—Political activist and member of the Women's Emergency Committee to Open Our Schools that lobbied for the re-opening of Little Rock Central High School during the Little Rock Integration Crisis.
- Calvin Ledbetter, Jr. (1946)—Educator and politician; member of the Arkansas House of Representatives (1967–1977).
- Sarah Huckabee Sanders (ca. 2000), former White House Press Secretary and Governor of Arkansas (since 2023)
- Clarke Tucker (1999)—Democratic member of the Arkansas House of Representatives for Pulaski County since 2015.
- Darrin Williams—Member of the Arkansas House of Representatives (2009–15).
- Woodrow Wilson Mann (ca. 1935)—Mayor of Little Rock (1955–57).
- Mark Pryor—U.S. Senator, Arkansas (2003–15).

=== Arts and entertainment ===
- Julie Adams (1944)—Actress.
- Matt Besser (1985)—Actor and comedian.
- Dee Brown (ca. 1926)—Novelist and historian.
- Rodger Bumpass (1970)—Notable voice actor.
- Gail Davis (ca. 1943)—TV and film actress, known for her starring role as Annie Oakley in the 1950s television Western series Annie Oakley.
- Dani Evans—Fashion model; winner of 2006 Next Top Model.
- Brent Jennings (1969)—TV and film actor.
- Charlotte Moorman (1951)—Cellist and performance artist.
- George Newbern (1982)—TV and film actor.
- Walter Norris (1950)—Pianist and composer.
- Ben Piazza (1951)—TV and film actor.
- Jason White (1992)—Musician; Green Day Guitarist.
- Clifton Williams (1941)—Composer of symphonic band music
- Jeff Nichols (1996)- Director, writer, and producer of Loving, Mud, and others.
- Kari Faux (2008)- Hip-hop and rap musician

=== Commerce and industry ===
- James Smith McDonnell (1917)—Aviation pioneer and founder of McDonnell Aircraft Corporation.
- Sanford N. McDonnell (1940)—Engineer, businessman and philanthropist; former chairman and CEO of McDonnell Douglas.

=== Military ===
- Henry C. Bruton (1921), highly decorated Rear admiral
- John H. Yancey (ca.1937), highly decorated United States Marine

=== Sports ===
- Mike Beard (1968)—Former professional baseball player.
- Alvin Bell (1919)—Umpire; all-around high school and collegiate athlete; 1978 inductee, Arkansas Sports Hall of Fame
- Charles Clay (2006)- NFL player Buffalo Bills
- Walt Coleman (1970)—Football player (NFL); inductee, Arkansas Sports Hall of Fame.
- John Hoffman (1945)—NFL player (1949–1956); 1976 inductee, Arkansas Sports Hall of Fame
- Joe Johnson (1999)—NBA All Star and USA basketball player.
- Ken Kavanaugh (1936) – Player and coach in College Football Hall of Fame; 3-time National Football League champion for Chicago Bears.
- Luis Peña (fighter) (2012) – Mixed Martial Artist who has competed at Featherweight in the Ultimate Fighting Championship
- Danny Nutt (1980)—Former assistant coach of collegiate football.
- Dennis Nutt (1981)—Men's basketball head coach of collegiate basketball: former professional player.
- Dickey Nutt (1977)—Men's basketball head coach of collegiate basketball.
- Houston Nutt (1976)—Former head coach of the University of Arkansas Razorbacks and the University of Mississippi Rebels football teams
- Jack Robbins (1933)—Football and basketball standout player, NFL player; 1974 inductee, Arkansas Sports Hall of Fame.
- Brooks Robinson (1955)—Hall of Fame third baseman for the Baltimore Orioles
- Drew Smyly (2007)—Baseball player
- Reggie Swinton (1993)—Former football player.
- Harry Vines (1957)—Wheelchair basketball coach.
- Fred Williams (ca. 1947)—Four-time NFL Pro Bowl defense lineman.
- Kahlil Carter (1994)—Former professional football player.
