= Encyclopedia of Arkansas =

General knowledge English-language encyclopedia

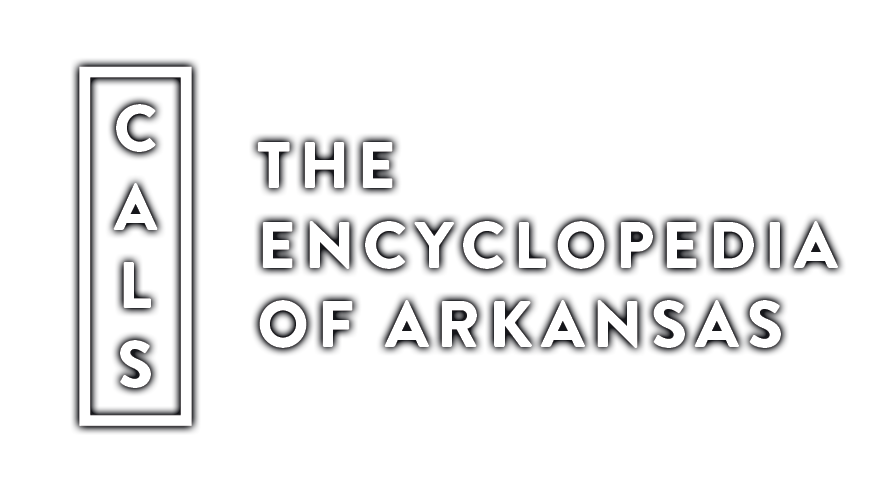
- Language: English
- Genre: Encyclopedia
- Publisher: Central Arkansas Library System
- Publication date: 2006–present
- Publication place: United States
- Media type: Digital
- OCLC: 68194233
- Website: encyclopediaofarkansas.net

Encyclopedia of Arkansas is a web-based encyclopedia of the U.S. state of Arkansas, described by the National Endowment for the Humanities (NEH) as "a free, authoritative source of information about the history, politics, geography, and culture of the state of Arkansas".

Created and funded by the Central Arkansas Library System (CALS), the encyclopedia is a project of the Butler Center for Arkansas Studies at the Little Rock-based CALS. CALS has pledged to keep the encyclopedia in operation in perpetuity.

== History ==
The encyclopedia was officially launched in 2006 with 700 entries and 900 multimedia items. By June 2014, it had grown to more than 3,600 entries and 5,000 multimedia items; as of 2021, the site had more than 6,500 entries and 10,500 pieces of media. The website was redesigned in 2019 to add functions and support for mobile devices. The project has a staff of five; articles are written by contributors who receive a payment of 5 cents per word. Tom W. Dillard was the founding editor; as of 2018 the editor is Guy Lancaster, who was one of the first interns. The project is financially supported by the NEH; the Department of Arkansas Heritage, Arkansas General Assembly, and Arkansas Humanities Council; and by various foundations, principally the Winthrop Rockefeller Foundation.

The most-visited page on Encyclopedia of Arkansas is that of the Little Rock Nine. Other entries range from slime mold to various Civil War battles and skirmishes in Arkansas to cheese dip.

== See also ==
- List of online encyclopedias
