= Pike–Fletcher–Terry House =

Historic house in Arkansas, United States

- Pike-Fletcher-Terry House
- U.S. National Register of Historic Places
- U.S. Historic district – Contributing property
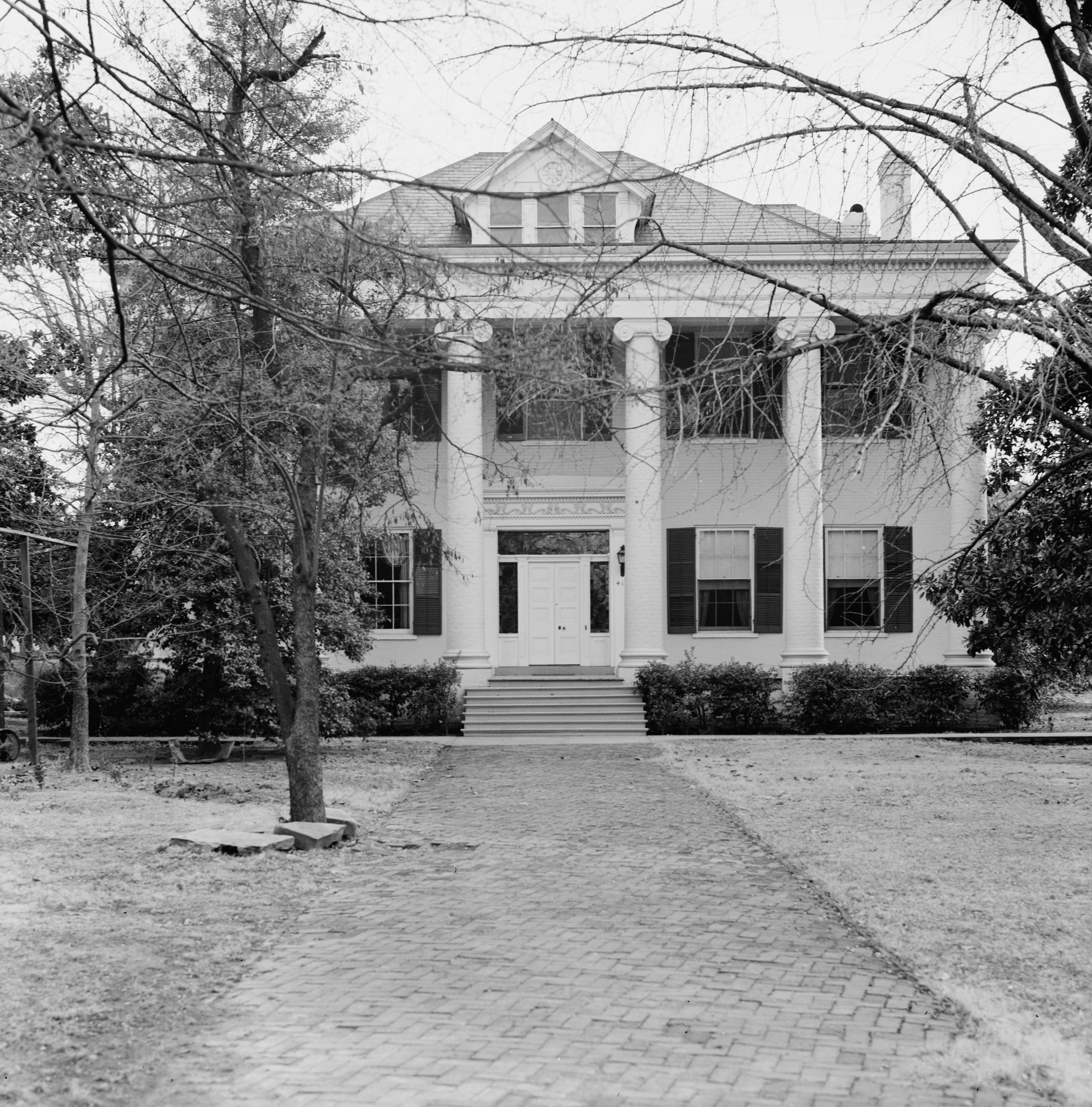

- Location within Arkansas Location within the United States
- Location: 8th and Rock Sts., Little Rock, Arkansas
- Coordinates: 34°44′28″N 92°15′53″W
- Area: less than one acre
- Built: 1840
- Architectural style: Greek Revival
- Part of: MacArthur Park Historic District (ID77000269)
- NRHP reference No.: 72000208

Significant dates
- Added to NRHP: August 21, 1972
- Designated CP: July 25, 1977

The Pike–Fletcher–Terry House, also known as just the Terry Mansion and now the Community Gallery at the Terry House, is a historic house at 8th and Rock Streets in central Little Rock, Arkansas. It is a large two-story Greek Revival building, whose grounds occupy the western end of a city block bounded by Rock, 8th, and 7th Streets. Its most prominent feature is its north-facing six-column Greek temple portico. The house was built in 1840 for Albert Pike, a leading figure in Arkansas' territorial and early state history. It has also been home to John Fletcher, a prominent Little Rock businessman and American Civil War veteran, and David D. Terry, Fletcher's son-in-law and also a prominent Arkansas politician. It was then home to prominent philanthropist and political activist Adolphine Fletcher Terry. She and her sister Mary Fletcher Drennan willed the family mansion to the city, for use by the nearby Arkansas Museum of Fine Arts. It has been a municipal building since 1964. It served as the Arkansas Decorative Arts Center from 1985 to 2003.

The house was listed on the National Register of Historic Places in 1972.

The Pike–Fletcher–Terry House is currently closed. There is ongoing litigation between the City of Little Rock, the Arkansas Museum of Fine Arts, and the Terry heirs.

== See also ==
- National Register of Historic Places listings in Little Rock, Arkansas
