= Johnswood =

Historic house in Arkansas, United States

- U.S. National Register of Historic Places
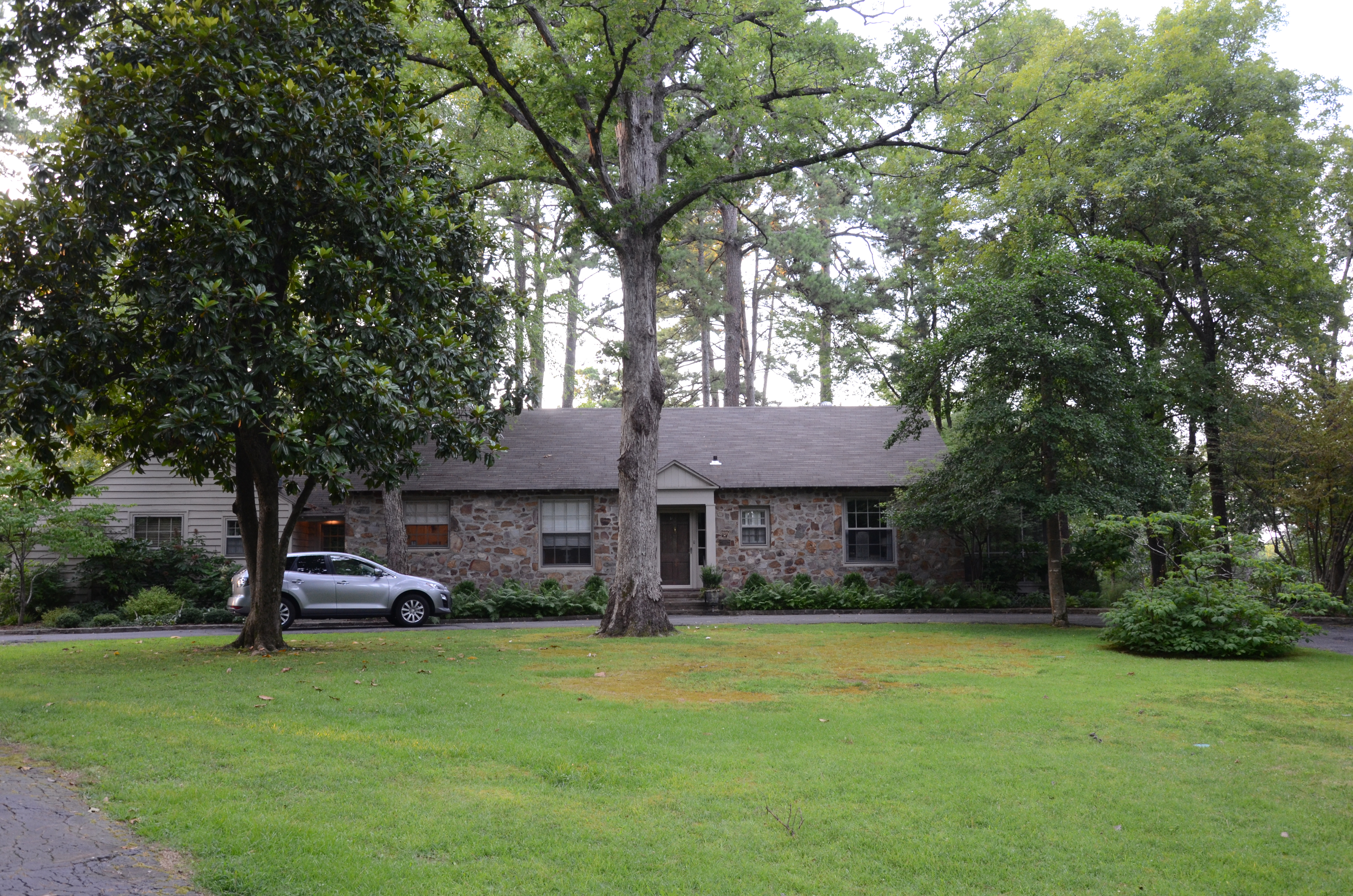

- Location within Arkansas Location within the United States
- Location: 10314 Cantrell Rd., Little Rock, Arkansas
- Coordinates: 34°47′17″N 92°23′16″W
- Area: 9 acres (3.6 ha)
- Built: 1941
- Architect: Maximilian F. Mayer
- Architectural style: Colonial Revival, Minimal Traditional
- NRHP reference No.: 94000495
- Added to NRHP: May 20, 1994

Johnswood is a historic house at 10314 Cantrell Road in Little Rock, Arkansas. It is a single-story structure, its main section built out of sandstone and capped by a side gable roof, with an attached wood frame section on the left end, with a front-facing gable roof. The main entrance is located in the center of the stone section, sheltered by a small gabled porch. The house was built in 1941 to a design by Maximilian F. Mayer for Arkansas authors John Gould Fletcher and Charlie May Simon. The house was at that time well outside the bounds of Little Rock in a rural setting, and was written about by Simon in an autobiographical work called Johnswood.

The house was listed on the National Register of Historic Places in 1994.

== See also ==
- National Register of Historic Places listings in Little Rock, Arkansas
