= Nancy Rousseau =

American school administrator and principal

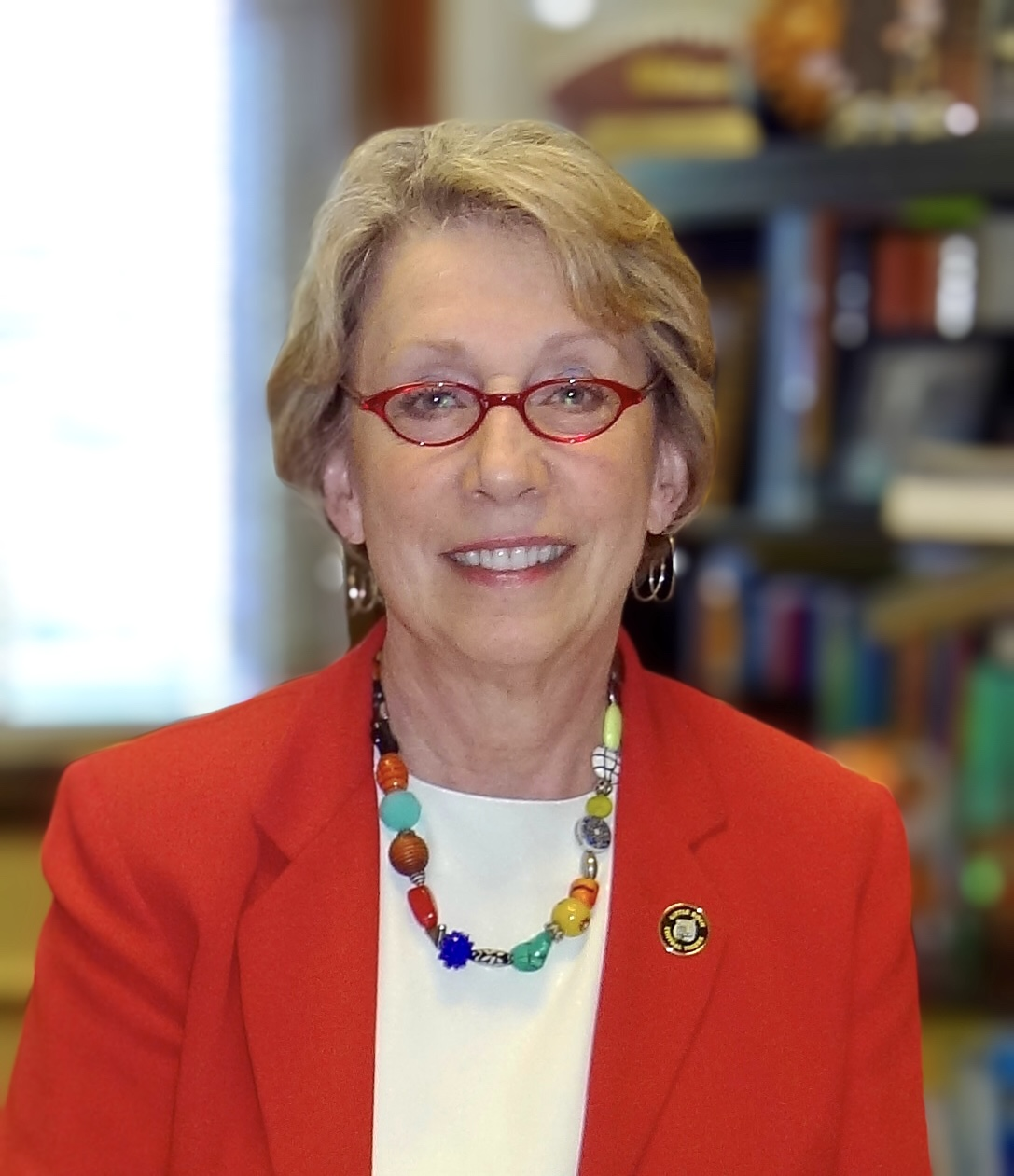
- Citizenship: American
- Education: Adelphi University, University of Arkansas at Little Rock
- Occupation: Educator

Nancy Rousseau is an American educator. Rousseau taught English at a number of schools around the country before settling in Little Rock, Arkansas where she became vice-principal, and later principal, of Little Rock Central High School. As principal of the school, which was at the center of a famous civil rights battle and a national historic site, Rousseau planned milestone events and hosted numerous dignitaries to the school.

== Early life and education ==
Nancy Lucker was born in New York about 1947, the daughter of Audrey and Jerome Lucker. She was raised in Tenafly, New Jersey. She attended Tenafly High School, where she was student chairman in her sophomore year, graduating in 1965. After attending Ohio University in Athens, Ohio for two years, Lucker later obtained a bachelor's degree in English education from Adelphi University in Garden City, New York and a master's degree in educational administration from the University of Arkansas at Little Rock.

== Career ==
Rousseau's first job was as an English teacher in Port Washington, New York. She then taught English in Midwest City, Oklahoma, relocating to Little Rock, Arkansas, in 1976. From 1976 to 1986, Rousseau worked as an English teacher at the private Pulaski Academy. Rousseau served as assistant principal at Little Rock Central High School from 1991 to 1998. In 1997, she organised the 40th year reunion of the Little Rock Nine.

From 1998 to 2002, she was principal at the city's Pulaski Heights Junior High School. During her time there, she led the school's transition from a junior high to a middle school.

In 2002, she returned to Little Rock Central High School as principal. The school, the site of a famous civil rights battle for integration, has a school population of approximately 2,500 students. In 2007, she organised the 50th year reunion of the Little Rock Nine. In 2024, after discovering that a new male principal was being paid $30,000 more than her despite over 30 years' service in the school district, Rousseau demanded the district school board increase her pay. In February 2026, Rousseau announced her plan to retire after more than 30 years as the head of the school.

== Personal life ==
Rousseau married second husband, architect Steve Rousseau, in 1978.

== Awards ==
- "New Teacher of the Year" Award, Port Washington, New York
- LULAC La Esperanza (Hope) Award (2018)
- Clinton Center's Educator Lifetime Achievement Award (2026)

== Bibliography ==
- Nightly news segment – Central High principal has been top Tiger for nearly 20 years THV11. Retrieved 2026-05-18. Via YouTube.
- Scott (2019-03-20). "Women Making History – Nancy Rousseau". Little Rock Culture Vulture.
- Baker, Tre (2017-09-25). "Little Rock, Big Hero: Nancy Rousseau of Little Rock Central High School". Little Rock Soirée.
