= Adolphine Fletcher Terry =

American political and social activist

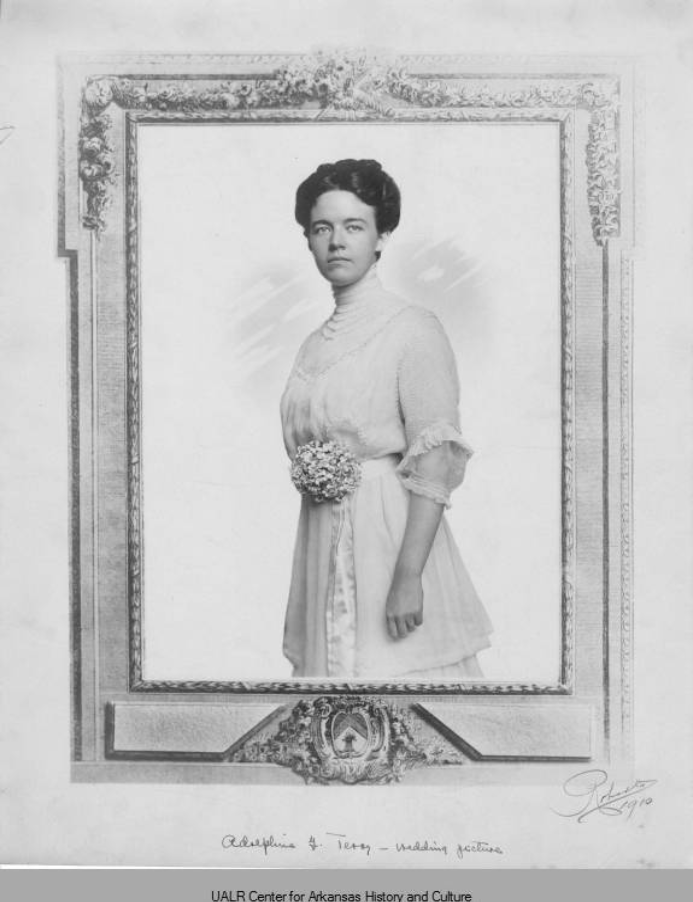
- Adolphine Fletcher Terry wedding photo, 1910
- Born: Adolphine Fletcher; February 11, 1882; Little Rock, Arkansas, U.S.
- Died: July 25, 1976 (aged 94); Little Rock, Arkansas, U.S.
- Burial place: Mount Holly Cemetery
- Monuments: Adolphine Fletcher Terry Library
- Education: Graduated Vassar College, 1902
- Occupations: Political and social activist
- Organizations: Adolphine Fletcher Terry Library; Arkansas Arts Center; Arkansas Association for University Women; Arkansas Boys Industrial School; Arkansas Girls Industrial School; Congressional Union for Woman Suffrage; Southern Association for College Women; Women's Emergency Committee to Open Our Schools
- Known for: Organizing the Women's Emergency Committee to Open Our Schools
- Spouse: David D. Terry (m. 1910)
- Children: David D. Terry Jr.; Mary Terry; Sally Terry; William (Bill) Terry; Joseph Terry (adopted)
- Relatives: John Gould Fletcher (II), brother; Mary Fletcher Drennan, sister

Adolphine Fletcher Terry (1882–1976) was an American political and social activist in the state of Arkansas. Terry leveraged her position within the Little Rock community to affect change in causes related to social justice, women's rights, racial equality, housing, and education. Fletcher is most remembered for her role on the Women's Emergency Committee to Open Our Schools (WEC) that was primarily responsible for reopening the Little Rock, Arkansas, public school system and bringing to a close the school district closing in 1958, following the Crisis at Little Rock Central High. In its "Millennium Poll" in 2000, the Arkansas Historical Association named Terry one of the state's 15 most significant figures in state history.

== Early life and education ==
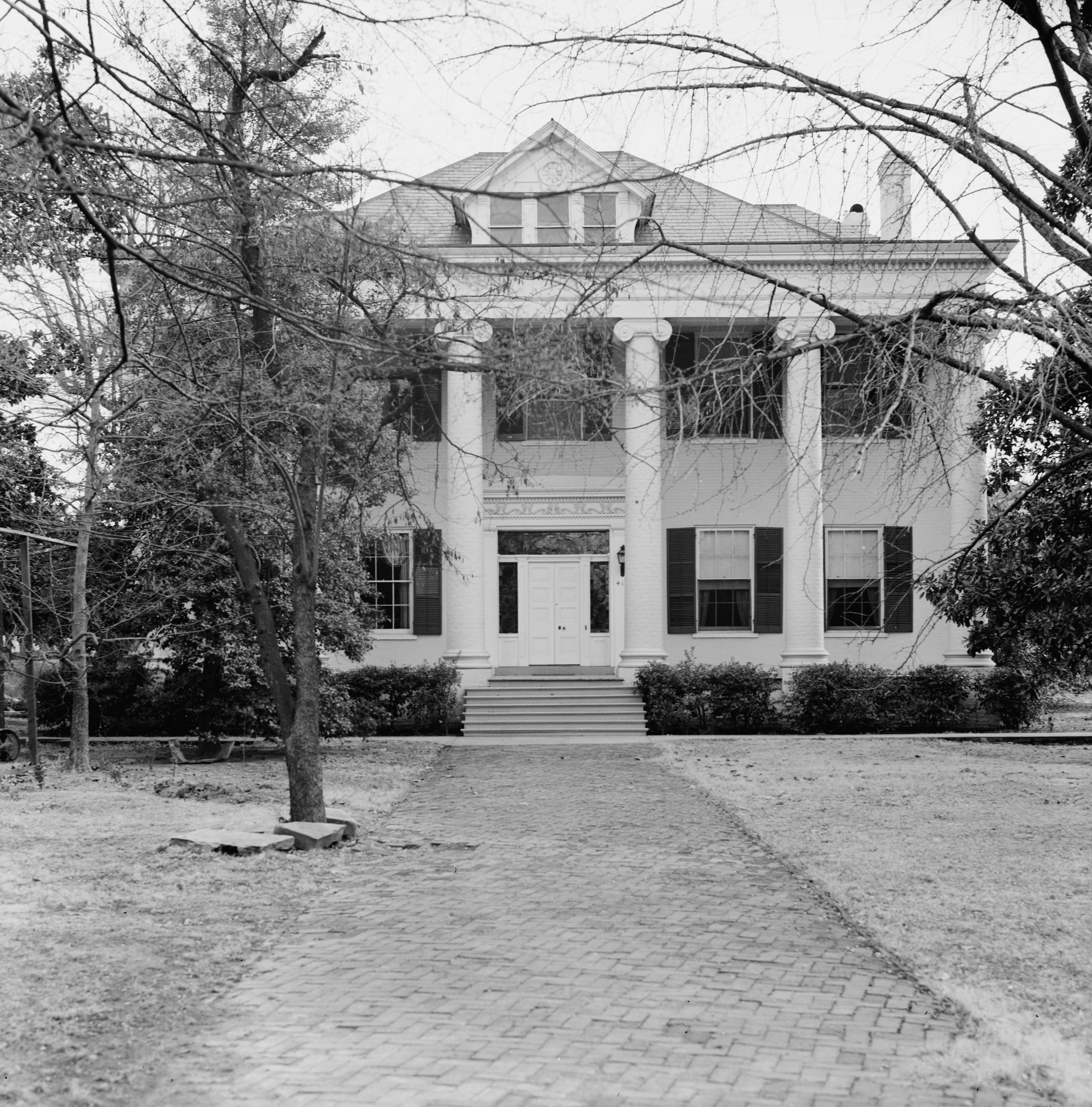
Pike-Fletcher-Terry House, 411 E. 7th Street, Little Rock, Arkansas. Adolphine Fletcher Terry married in the front parlor in 1910 and founded the Women's Emergency Committee to Open Our Schools here.

Terry was born in Little Rock, Arkansas, on November 3, 1882, to a socially and politically prominent family. She was the daughter of John Gould Fletcher (I), an Arkansas native and Confederate officer who became one of the South's leading cotton brokers and a prominent bank president. He was elected the first sheriff of Pulaski County and later served as mayor of Little Rock (1875 to 1881); he was unsuccessful in three bids for governor and one for Congress. Terry's mother was the former Adolphine Krause, daughter of a Little Rock merchant and a German immigrant. Terry had two younger siblings: Pulitzer Prize-winning poet John Gould Fletcher and suffragist Mary Fletcher Drennan.

Before marrying John Gould Fletcher, Terry's mother was compelled to leave school and abandon her pursuit of a career in music to care for her ailing mother and siblings. Because of this experience, Adolphine Krause became highly protective of her own children and encouraged educational achievements. Terry and her siblings were typically overdressed in layers of heavy cotton fabric, even in the heat of summer, and were discouraged from adventurous play for fear they would be injured.

In 1889, the Fletcher family purchased the former home of Albert Pike at 411 7th Street in Little Rock, Arkansas. The Greek Revival style home most recently housed the Arkansas Female College, and the Fletchers made significant improvements to restore it to a family residence. Terry would grow up, marry and live most of the rest of her life in that home, which served as the headquarters for her later activism and became known as the Pike–Fletcher–Terry House.

In her unpublished autobiography, Terry recalled an early "lesson in justice" that influenced her view of race relations. A cousin accused a young black house servant of stealing a diamond ring and demanded his arrest, only to find it hidden in the ruffles of her dress. At a time when such a charge would likely end in mob justice for the accused, the cousin went on with her day without a second thought. Terry, however, realized how the casual accusation imperiled the boy, and she never forgot the incident.

Like many privileged women of her time, Terry entered college at the early age of 15 after graduating Peabody High School in 1898. Following the wishes of her mother, became only the second Arkansan to attend the prestigious Vassar College in Poughkeepsie, New York. Vassar's curriculum engaged Terry with community issues of her time, taught her to think independently and planted a seed for social activism in her life. She also credits the influence of classmate Lucy Burns—who would go on to become one of the key figures to win passage of the 19th Amendment—for imparting a different view of race than she learned from her Southern upbringing. Terry graduated in 1902 and returned to Arkansas "... ready to change the world and she kept trying until her dying day to do it," according to her friend Judge Edwin Dunaway.

== Public life and social activism ==
Shortly after returning from college, Terry involved herself in many local clubs and activities like many other women of her time. Terry wasn't satisfied with just attending parties and appearing as a debutante. As a southern new woman, Terry felt the desire to join clubs and involve herself in the needs of her community. Throughout her life that need permeated her everyday and Terry became a champion for causes both small and large, and she used her position to help others less fortunate than herself.

=== Education ===
In 1905 Terry was responsible for co-founding the Southern Association for College Women which provided a forum for college educated women to discuss issues that were important to them. This organization would later become the Arkansas Association for University Women a division of the American Association of University Women. She also helped with education reform, pushing for school consolidation throughout the state of Arkansas. She was an advocate of hiring professional school administrators and formed the first school improvement association in the state. Terry maintained an interest in education throughout her life and led efforts to consolidate school districts and provide transportation for rural students.

=== Juveniles in Arkansas ===
In 1911 Terry was appointed by the local Women's Christian Temperance Union to investigate juvenile courts that had been established by legislation the group had championed. She was soon appointed the chairman of the juvenile court board for Pulaski County. She and other members of the board even took delinquent children into their own homes to keep them out of the state reform school that had been largely deemed a "place of punishment for bad children." Terry and other members of the board fought for the creation of the Boys Industrial School and the Girls Industrial School in 1917.

Terry also helped to form the African-American branch of the Young Women's Christian Association (YWCA) in Little Rock. Her assistance in this feat led to the YWCA opening in 1921.

=== Women's suffrage movement ===
In addition to her expanded views on race, Terry had a direct connection with the suffrage movement, in part, through her friendship with Vassar classmate Lucy Burns. As early as 1910, there is evidence of her involvement in a letter she wrote to Senator James P. Clarke to request an audience with "the representatives of the equal suffrage society" on their visit to Washington, D.C. Terry's sister Mary created the Political Equality League in 1911, kicking off a new wave of support for women's suffrage in the state. Both sisters were active in the organization, which sponsored educational efforts and lobbied for legislative changes pertaining to women's suffrage. The organization brought measures before the General Assembly in four separate sessions before they were able to persuade the legislature to grant women the right to vote in the state's primary elections in 1917.

Terry was a leader at both the state and national level in the campaign for women's suffrage. in January 1916 Terry presided over a Congressional Union for Woman Suffrage conference that convened at the Marion Hotel in Little Rock. CU founder Alice Paul spoke at the convention to garner support for an Arkansas chapter. The organization voted Terry to serve on the national advisory board of the CU and ex-officio member of the Arkansas executive committee.

=== Libraries and literacy ===
Terry is very well known for her advocacy for libraries. As a part of the Americanism committee for the state of Arkansas, she made it her mission to improve the libraries in the state. When she began her work, in 1934, there were only three reported libraries in the entire state of Arkansas due to poor state planning and lack of funding. Under her direction, legislation was passed to appropriate local funding statewide for the creation of public libraries. Terry was praised for her work on this project throughout her life. She served as a trustee of the Little Rock Public Library for 40 years until her retirement in 1966.

=== Women's Emergency Committee ===
In 1958 Terry founded the Women's Emergency Committee to Open Our Schools as a critical response to the Little Rock Crisis over school integration. Her leadership of the white women of Little Rock was a major obstacle to the efforts of Governor Orval Faubus to keep the schools from integrating. "In 1959, the WEC, black voters, and a group called Stop This Outrageous Purge campaigned successfully to recall three school board members who were segregationists...The WEC efforts, including a study documenting the negative effect the school crisis was having on Little Rock’s economy, altered the course of public action and helped reopen the schools in 1959."

== Personal life ==
Adolphine Fletcher Terry and David D. Terry (1881–1963) were married in the Fletcher home on July 7, 1910. The Terrys had four children, David D. Terry Jr. (1911–1962), Mary Terry (1914–1974) born with a rare defect called osteogenesis imperfecta, Sally Terry (1916–1986), and William (Bill) Terry (1922–2016). The Terrys also cared for David, Sr.'s sister after the death of his parents, as well as adopted Joseph, an orphan that their daughter Mary became friends with while receiving treatment for her illness. Terry took care of her large family throughout World War I and during David, Sr.'s career while still maintaining her role as an important Little Rock community member.

David Sr. was involved in politics. From 1929 to 1933 he served on the Little Rock School Board. After completing his tenure on the school board he was elected to the state legislature in 1933. Eventually David would go on to have two successful terms in the United States House of Representatives, but would lose races for both United States Senate and the Arkansas governorship. He died of Parkinson's disease on October 6, 1963.

"Terry's son William and his wife Betty continue to be active in Little Rock. Their daughters and their families also carry on Adolphine Fletcher Terry’s commitment to making Little Rock better."

== Later life and legacy ==
Following a severe stroke, Adolphine Fletcher Terry was moved from her childhood home into a long-term care facility where she died on July 25, 1976, at 93. Terry is buried alongside her husband in historic Mount Holly Cemetery in downtown Little Rock. Terry and her sister Mary Fletcher Drennan deeded the Pike–Fletcher–Terry House to the City of Little Rock in 1964 for use by the Arkansas Arts Center. Drennan, who did not live in Arkansas as an adult, surrendered her life estate and turned the title over to the city in 1977. The home opened as the Decorative Arts Museum on March 24, 1985.

On April 27, 1990, the Central Arkansas Library System dedicated its seventh branch as the Adolphine Fletcher Terry Library in West Little Rock. Festivities for the two-day opening included a presentation by author and newspaper editor Harry Ashmore, a performance of Jack and the Beanstalk by the Arkansas Arts Center's Tell-a-Tale Troupe, folk dancing by the Arkansas Country Dance Society and folk music by the Rackensack Society. Construction of the library cost $1.9 million, collected as part of a bond issue passed in 1987. The library opened with 22,000 books and one mile of shelving.

== Works ==
Terry was an avid writer and published many works throughout her lifetime.

- Courage! (1938)
- Cordelia, Member of the Household (1967)
- Charlotte Stephens, Little Rock’s First Black Teacher (1973)
- Life is My Song, unpublished
