= Calvin Ledbetter Jr. =

American educator and politician

Member of the Arkansas House of Representatives
- In office 1967–1977

Personal details
- Born: Calvin Reville Ledbetter Jr. April 29, 1928 Little Rock, Arkansas, U.S.
- Died: August 10, 2013 (aged 85) Little Rock, Arkansas, U.S.
- Party: Democratic
- Spouse: Mary Brown Williams (m. 1953)
- Education: Little Rock Central High School; Princeton School of Public and International Affairs; University of Arkansas School of Law; Northwestern University
- Profession: Politician, educator

Military service
- Allegiance: United States
- Branch/service: United States Army Adjutant General's Corps

Calvin Reville "Cal" Ledbetter Jr. (April 29, 1928 – August 10, 2013) was an American educator and politician.

Born in Little Rock, Arkansas, he graduated from Little Rock Central High School. He then received his bachelor's degree from the Woodrow Wilson School of Public and International Affairs at Princeton University. At Princeton, Ledbetter was elected President of a "States' Rights" club that supported the 1948 Presidential Campaign of segregationist South Carolina Senator Strom Thurmond. His senior thesis, titled "Jeff Davis: Backwoods Messiah", was about Arkansas politician Jeff Davis. He earned his law degree at the University of Arkansas School of Law, and his doctorate degree from Northwestern University. Ledbetter served in the United States Army Adjutant General's Corps in Germany. In 1953, he married Mary Brown Williams. Ledbetter taught at the University of Arkansas at Little Rock 1960–1997. He served in the Arkansas Constitutional Convention of 1968–1970. Ledbetter then served in the Arkansas House of Representatives 1967-1977 as a Democrat. Ledbetter also wrote several historical books and papers. Ledbetter died in Little Rock, Arkansas on August 10, 2013.
