= Little Rock Police Department =

Law enforcement agency in Little Rock, Arkansas, US

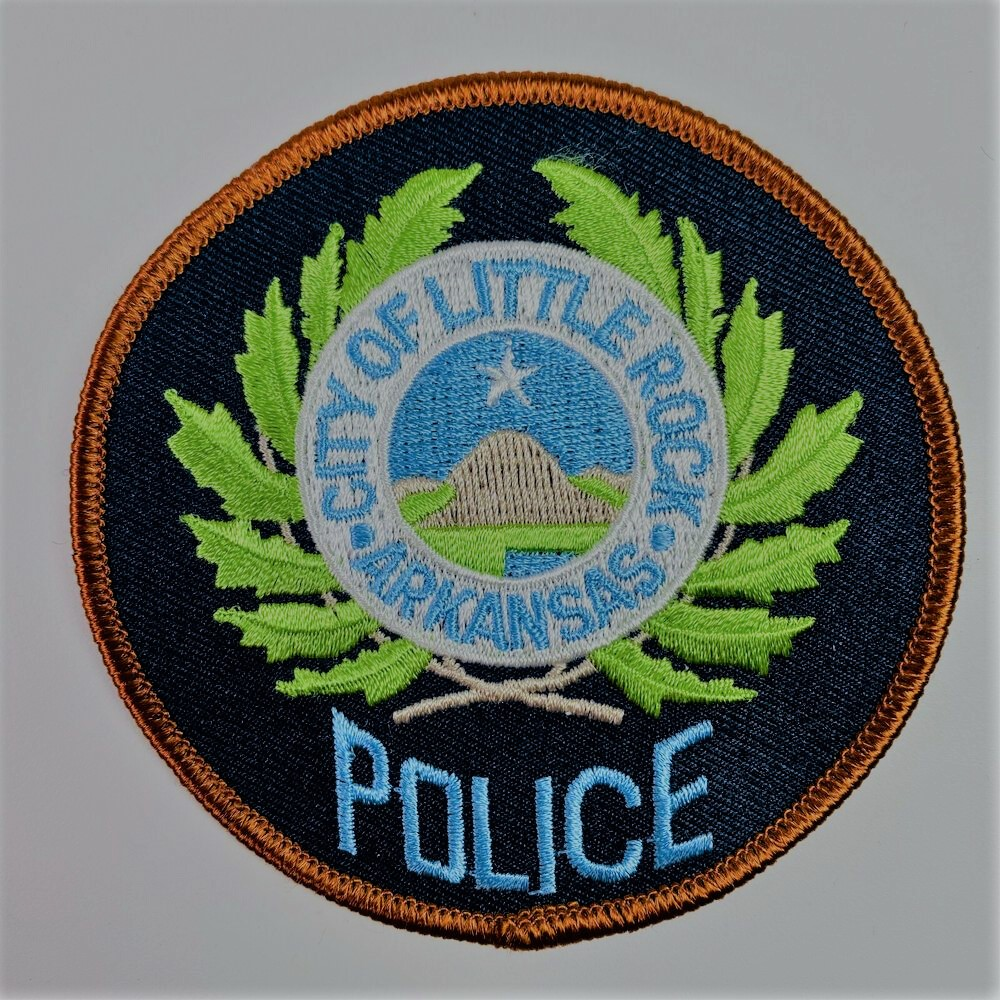

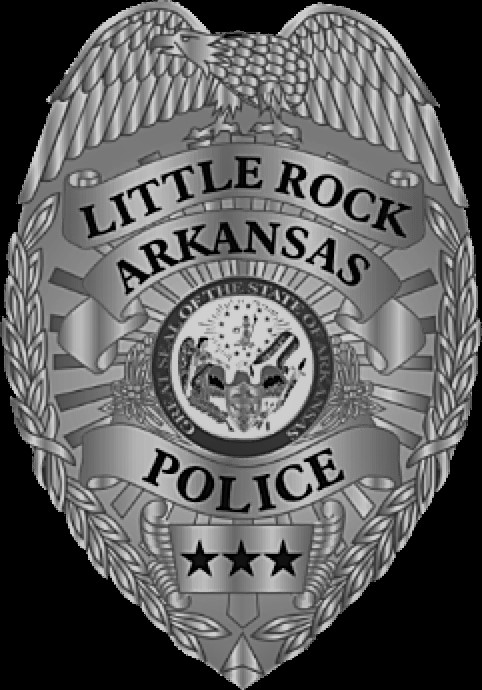

- Flag of Little Rock, Arkansas
- Common name: Little Rock Police Department
- Abbreviation: LRPD

Agency overview
- Formed: January 20, 1866
- Employees: 713 (2019)
- Annual budget: $80,209,890 (2020)

Jurisdictional structure
- Operations jurisdiction: Little Rock, Arkansas, United States
- jurisdiction of Little Rock Police Department
- Area: 116.8 square miles (303 km^{2})
- Population: 204,405 (2023)
- Legal jurisdiction: Little Rock, Arkansas
- General nature: Local civilian police

Operational structure
- Overseen by Council: Little Rock Board of Directors
- Headquarters: 615 W. Markham St. Little Rock, AR 72201
- Police Officers: 581 (2019)
- Civilians: 132 (2019)
- Agency executive: Heath Helton, Chief of Police
- Bureaus: Investigative Bureau; Executive Bureau; Field Services Bureau

Facilities
- Patrol Divisions: Downtown Division; Northwest Patrol; Southwest Patrol; Special Operations Division

Website
- Little Rock Police Department

The Little Rock Police Department (LRPD), is the primary law enforcement agency for Little Rock, Arkansas in the United States.

== History ==
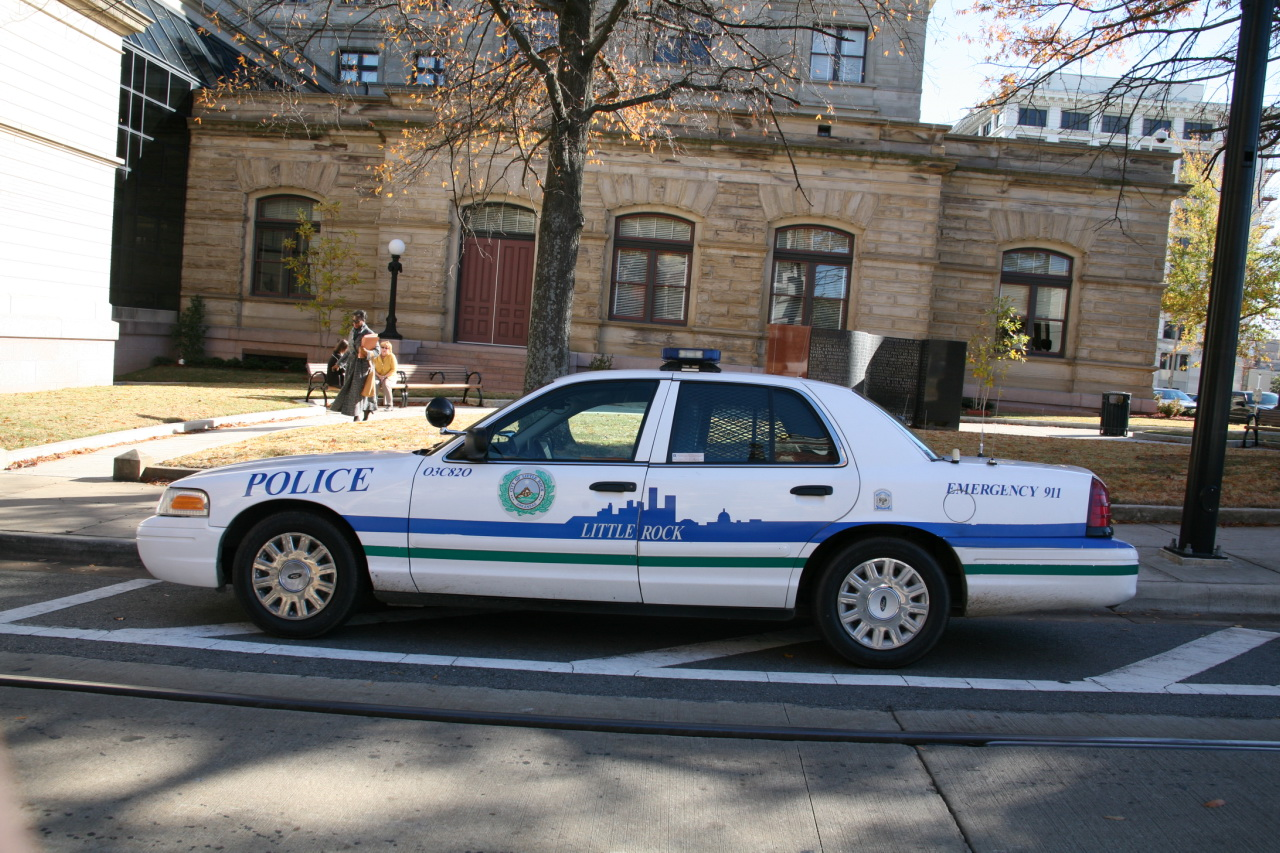
An LRPD cruiser

In 1831 the Town of Little Rock was incorporated and Dr. Matthew Cunningham won the first mayoral election. In 1835 Little Rock was incorporated as the first City in the Arkansas Territory. The Little Rock Police Department was established in 1866 and in 1892 the first paid Little Rock Fire Department was created.

=== Civil rights era ===
The Little Rock Police placed barriers around Little Rock Central High School during the anti-integration riots against the Little Rock Nine. During the integration of the school, the Arkansas National Guard was called in to prevent the Nine from entering the school. Governor Faubus was persuaded by President Eisenhower to remove the guard, and at the time of their removal, the Little Rock Police Department took over the situation and attempted to escort the Nine into the school. Due to the rioting, the police were forced to evacuate the students. Eventually, the 101st Airborne Division was called in by Eisenhower to bring order to the situation.

In 2003, the son of Elizabeth Eckford, who was one of the Nine, was killed by Little Rock Police after pointing an assault rifle at them: she described it as "suicide by police". According to an LRPD officer, he had mental health issues.

Little Rock Police arrested the Freedom Riders when they entered the city in 1957.

In 1978 a group of officers filed suit against the LRPD for racial discrimination. The court ultimately found in favor of LRPD.

=== Misconduct ===
In 1988, Police Chief Jess F. ″Doc″ Hale was arrested after stealing less than $200 from a drug store register. After being suspended, he committed suicide.

In January 2011, Officer Jason Gilbert and two other officers from nearby agencies were indicted for a conspiracy to rob an armored car. The charges included a failed September 10, 2007 attempt to rob an armored car. In March 2012, Gilbert was sentenced to three and a half years in prison.

In February 2011, Officer Rick Harmon was arrested for drunk driving.

In May 2012 two officers, Mark Anthony Jones and Randall Tremayn Robinson, were arrested after helping to facilitate drug deals while on duty.

=== Josh Hastings ===
In September 2012, Officer Josh Hastings was charged with manslaughter in the shooting death of fifteen-year-old Bobby Moore. According to the charging documents, Moore was shot in the head as he was backing away from the officer trying to flee in a stolen car. Officer Hastings had been on the force for five years and had been suspended six times previously. In April, 2014, after two deadlocked juries, charges were dropped as prosecutors said no jury was willing to convict Hastings. He had been fired from his job, but his lawyer said he would take steps to return to the department. Later investigation revealed that Hastings was hired in spite of internal objections of Hastings having once attended a Ku Klux Klan meeting and lying about it on his application. During his tenure at LRPD, Hastings used force an estimated 63 times and collected over 30 disciplinary citations, for actions such as "sleeping on the job, abusive language, failure to file reports, failure to appear in court, failure to notify authorities of a dead body, conduct unbecoming an officer, insubordination, and untruthfulness", as well as reckless driving.

=== SWAT operation ===
In early 2019, press reports indicated that the department serves all search warrants with a SWAT unit. Most drug-related warrants are "no-knock," meaning the police can use explosives to enter a home without warning.

== Rank structure ==
Rank	Insignia
Chief	
Assistant Chief	
Captain	
Lieutenant	
Sergeant	
Police Officer	

The Little Rock Police Department has various positions for detectives, Field Training Officers, and other mission specific assignments, but these are not considered official ranks by the department.

== Organization ==
The department is organized into a number of divisions. These are:

- Executive Bureau
  - Headquarters
  - Training Division
  - Communications Division
- Investigative Bureau
  - Records and Support Division
  - Major Crimes Division
- Investigative Bureau
  - Special Investigations Division
- Field Services Bureau
  - Special Operations Division
  - Patrol Division
    - 12th Street Patrol
    - Northwest Patrol
    - Southwest Patrol

== LRPD Fallen Heros ==
Rank	Name F MI L	Date of death	Cause of death	Age	
Officer	William L. Copeland	12-31-1885	Beaten and killed with a blunt object as he questioned a work release prisoner as to why he was in town and not back in jail past his allotted time	N/A	N/A
Police Officer	W.T. Phillips	08-02-1908	Shot and killed while attempting to arrest a drunk man shortly after midnight	22	N/A
Sergeant	William I. Campbell	04-18-1911	Shot and killed by a fellow drunk Officer during an argument	32	N/A
Police Officer	John O. Miller	04-23-1911	Shot and killed while attempting to arrest a man for disturbing the peace	N/A	N/A
Detective	Sam D. Morgan	10-30-1915	Shot and killed with another Officer's gun during a fight with a man that multiple Officers were attempting to arrest	55	On W 12th Street in Little Rock, Arkansas
Police Officer	Joe Erber	06-06-1920	Shot and killed after arriving on scene to a domestic disturbance call involving a drunk man	59	At a house boat on the Arkansas River near Lincoln Avenue in North Little Rock, Arkansas
Police Officer	Thomas D. Hudson	08-19-1920	Shot and killed after interrupting a burglary in progress	26	Inside a cafe on W 9th Street in Little Rock, Arkansas
Detective Sergeant	John W. Cabiness	08-12-1922	Accidentally shot and killed by a U.S. Marshal who mistook Sergeant Cabiness for a railroad striker that was out to get him	N/A	N/A
Detective Sergeant	George W. Moore	07-24-1923	Shot and killed along with Detective Sergeant Luther C. Hay (who later died on 07–26–1923) after the two men walked in on illegal activities including a dice game; one of the suspects was wanted for the earlier murder of Okmulgee County (OK) Deputy Sheriff John Lung on 09-15-1922	N/A	N/A
Detective Sergeant	Luther C. Hay	07-26-1923	Succumbed to six gunshot wounds sustained on 07-24-1923 after being shot along with Detective Sergeant George W. Moore (who died at the scene) after the two men walked in on illegal activities including a dice game; one of the suspects was wanted for the earlier murder of Okmulgee County (OK) Deputy Sheriff John Lung on 09-15-1922	N/A	N/A
Police Officer	Charles B. Faulkner	07-13-1924	Succumbed to injuries sustained on 07-11-1924 after being in a crash while on his motorcycle after a vehicle pulled out in front of him; Officer Faulkner was responding to a drunken fight at the time	27	N/A
Police Officer	Harvey L. Biggs	07-27-1924	Shot and killed as he and his partner lay in wait for several men that were stealing parts off an abandoned car in a ditch	33	N/A
Police Officer	Frank E. Swilling Sr.	12-11-1926	Succumbed to injuries sustained the previous day after being struck by a vehicle while on a traffic stop	33	Intersection of 4th Street and Main Street in Little Rock, Arkansas
Police Officer	Robert A. Johnson	03-23-1930	Killed in a crash while on his police motorcycle after being struck by a car	23	Intersection of 3rd Street and Victory Street in Little Rock, Arkansas
Detective Sergeant	Samuel Neal McDermott	09-03-1930	Succumbed to gunshot wounds sustained on 08-27-1930 after being shot while attempting to arrest two out of six escaped prisoners from the Pulaski County Jail	31	Behind the Little Rock National Cemetery in Little Rock, Arkansas
Detective Lieutenant	Oscar F. Deubler	01-01-1947	Shot and killed by a fellow Officer who then committed suicide	32	N/A
Police Officer	Lloyd W. Worthy	09-02-1967	Shot and killed while chasing a man leaving the scene of an abandoned vehicle he stopped to investigate	27	N/A
Police Officer	Alvin Joseph Free	09-27-1970	Killed in a crash while in his patrol car after a vehicle pulled out in front of him as he responded to backup at a domestic disturbance call	22	N/A
Detective	Noel Don McGuire	05-14-1980	Shot and killed by a 15-year-old while on a traffic stop; unknown to Detective McGuire, the 15 y/o and his 16 y/o partner had just committed an armed robbery in the neighboring county	23	N/A
Patrolman	David E. Barnett	02-13-1991	Shot and killed while off-duty as he attempted to stop an armed robbery	33	Inside a Waffle House in Little Rock, Arkansas
Patrolman	Henry Lee Callanen	05-15-1993	Shot and killed while off-duty working his second job at a local McDonald's; as Patrolman Callanen walked the short distance from McDonald's to the local bank to make a deposit, he was confronted by two robbers that held him up, leading to a shootout	62	N/A
Detective	Joseph Tucker Fisher	02-07-1995	Shot and killed as he helped serve a narcotics warrant at an apartment complex; Detective Frederick Lee was also shot in the head but survived	34	In an apartment complex on Butler Road in Little Rock, Arkansas
Police Officer	Jack David Cooper	02-02-2002	Succumbed to gunshot wounds sustained the previous day after being shot by a man he responded to due to complaining of vampires	34	N/A
K9	Titus	07-15-2015	Died from heat exhaustion following a fairly long foot pursuit of a suspect wanted for breaking into vehicles	N/A	N/A
Police Officer	Oscar F. Barnett	07-24-2015	Shot and killed in the chest after responding to a suspicious person call	N/A	N/A
