= Women's Emergency Committee to Open Our Schools =

Women's Emergency Committee to Open Our Schools (WEC)
- Formation: 1958
- Type: Civil rights
- Headquarters: Little Rock, Arkansas, US
- Members: 1,400
- Official language: English
- President: Adolphine Fletcher Terry
- Key people: Vivion Brewer, Velma Powell

The Women's Emergency Committee to Open Our Schools (WEC) was an organization formed by a group of socially prominent white women in the city of Little Rock, Arkansas during the Little Rock Crisis in 1958. The organization advocated for the integration of the Little Rock public school system and was a major obstacle to Governor Orval Faubus's efforts to prevent racial integration. The women spoke out in favor of a special election to remove segregationists from the Little Rock school board.

== Background ==
After the U.S. Supreme Court issued its Brown v. Board of Education ruling on May 17, 1954, segregated schools were ruled to be unconstitutional. The NAACP soon signed up nine high-achieving black students, the Little Rock Nine, for attendance at Little Rock Central High School, a previously all-white school. After the school became the site of demonstrations and protests on September 4, 1957, Arkansas Governor Orval Faubus deployed the Arkansas National Guard to the school to prevent the students from entering, contradicting the Supreme Court and the wishes of the school district. The crisis escalated with Faubus ordering all public schools in the city closed, rather than allowing the integration of the nine students.

== Creation ==
In response to the crisis, Adolphine Terry, Vivion Brewer, and Velma Powell formed the Women's Emergency Committee to Open Our Schools (WEC). Terry, then a 75-year-old woman, was a Vassar graduate, the widow of Congressman David D. Terry, and highly influential in her community. Brewer, a Smith College graduate, had founded Little Rock's orchestra and library, and was the wife of Senator Joe T. Robinson's nephew and the daughter of a former Little Rock mayor.

Terry organized the first meeting in her home on September 16, 1958, which was attended by 58 women; it would expand to 1400 by May, the majority of whom were white, wealthy, and educated. This collective wealth insulated them from the economic ramifications of vocal opposition to desegregation faced by pro-integration businessmen and newspapers, and their husbands were not held accountable for the actions of their wives. Nonetheless, the women faced public opposition ranging from harassment, insults, and death threats delivered in phone calls and letters. Though envisioned by its founders as an interracial organization advocating for full integration, membership of the organization feared the position would harm its public support. The group positioned itself as a political group dedicated to re-opening schools, and maintained a primarily white membership.

The WEC was active in encouraging Little Rock voters to vote for integration as a means to end the crisis during a special election ordered by Governor Faubus. The group organized phone trees and car pools for voters, but the first election was a failure for the WEC. The WEC responded by putting public pressure on white men in the community, lobbying business leaders and later publishing The Little Rock Report on the economic impact of the crisis. The organization also created a "SEX" committee designed to create a charm offensive to lure male community leaders and businessmen to be more vocal against segregation; the committee once encouraged women to withhold sex from their husbands, though it is unclear how serious the suggestion was.

The WEC was the first white organization to speak out against segregation in Little Rock, hosting a short televised panel among its members and later organizing a televised panel of local ministers.

== Campaigns ==
=== School board elections ===
After the resignation of five school board members, the WEC started a signature campaign to recruit moderate and liberal business leaders to run for the positions. The WEC managed to achieve an evenly-divided school board in the election, though their role in the campaign and their organization of the slate was kept secret to avoid negative associations with the candidates. The deadlocked schoolboard would later force a recall election.

=== Promoting economic effects ===
In January 1958, the WEC began a newspaper advertisement campaign highlighting the adverse economic effect of the segregation crisis in Little Rock, building off of a strategy recommended by the Virginia Committee for Public Schools. In 1959, the Chamber of Commerce polled its members and found 71 percent supported "a minimal plan of integration" to bring an end to the crisis. In response, segregationists demanded the names of the WEC membership roster under the 1957 Bennett Ordinance, which required organizations to list rosters and financial contributors. To protect its members, the WEC never compiled a formal list, and kept one copy of its mailing list hidden in a different home each night. When only financial documents were submitted to the city's Board of Directors, the WEC officers were threatened with arrest, but none of its members were ever arrested.

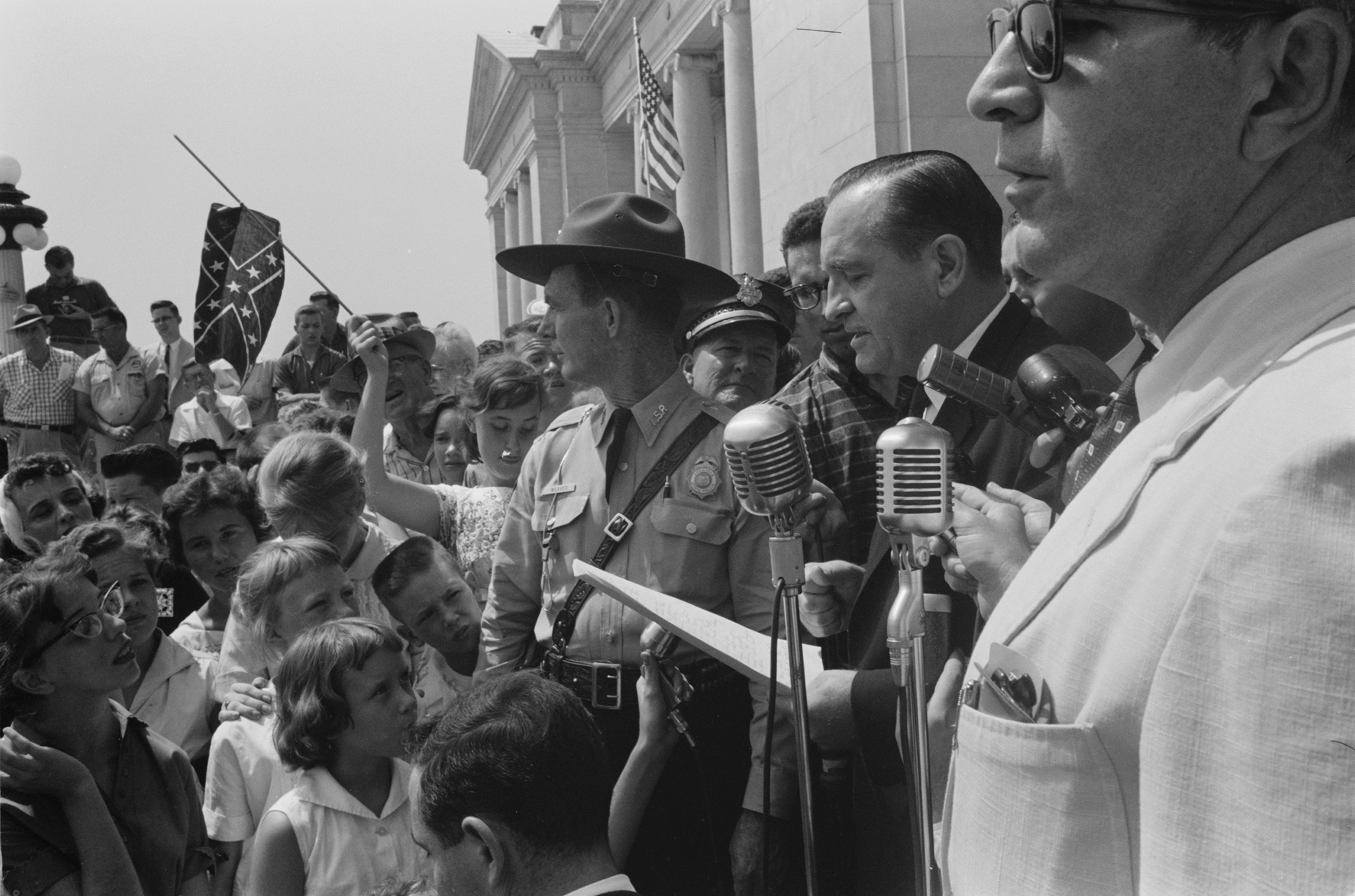
Little Rock, 1959. Rally at state capitol. Photograph shows a group of people, one holding a Confederate flag, surrounding speakers and National Guard, protesting the admission of the "Little Rock Nine" to Central High School.

=== School board recall ===
During the same period, members of the WEC began actively lobbying the Arkansas General Assembly on a daily basis. By February 1959, Arkansas State Representative T. E. Tyler drafted a bill that would allow Governor Faubus to appoint three temporary members to the Little Rock School Board. WEC members confronted Tyler on the bill, who responded by telling the women to "please shut up" and admitting that the law was "a little on the dictator side". The bill was eventually defeated.

In May 1959, the Little Rock School Board voted against contract renewals for 45 teachers believed to be supportive of federal integration efforts, despite lacking a quorum after moderate members of the board walked out of the meeting. That action pushed the WEC to launch a door-to-door recall effort for the remaining school board members, including editorial writing and voter registration and mobilization. With multiple groups voicing opposition to the board's action, including the League of Women Voters, the Chamber of Commerce, the Little Rock Parent-Teacher Association, and the Little Rock Ministerial Alliance, a new organization, "Stop This Outrageous Purge" (STOP), was formed by Edward Lester, Maurice Mitchell, Robert Shults, and Gene Fritz. Though STOP would avoid public association with the WEC, Lester, Mitchell and Shults were married to WEC members; in later interviews many would give credit to the WEC for the success of STOP. The WEC became the workforce for STOP's strategic plans, gathering 9,000 signatures supporting a recall of segregationist school board members, circulating handbills, and mobilizing voters based on experiences in past campaigns.

The campaign resulted in a recall of the segregationist school board members and elected three new moderates, all credited to the STOP campaign. On August 12, 1959, Little Rock's public high schools re-opened with black students in every school.

== Aftermath ==
Members of the WEC continued to work for education issues and to support campaigns of moderate integrationists in the South, offering advisory roles for similar organizations in Atlanta and New Orleans. However, with a lack of specific goals, the group eventually voted to disband in 1963. In 2015, the organization was honored in the inaugural group of women and organizations inducted into the Arkansas Women's Hall of Fame.
