= Central Arkansas Library System =

Public library system in Central Arkansas

Central Arkansas Library System (CALS)
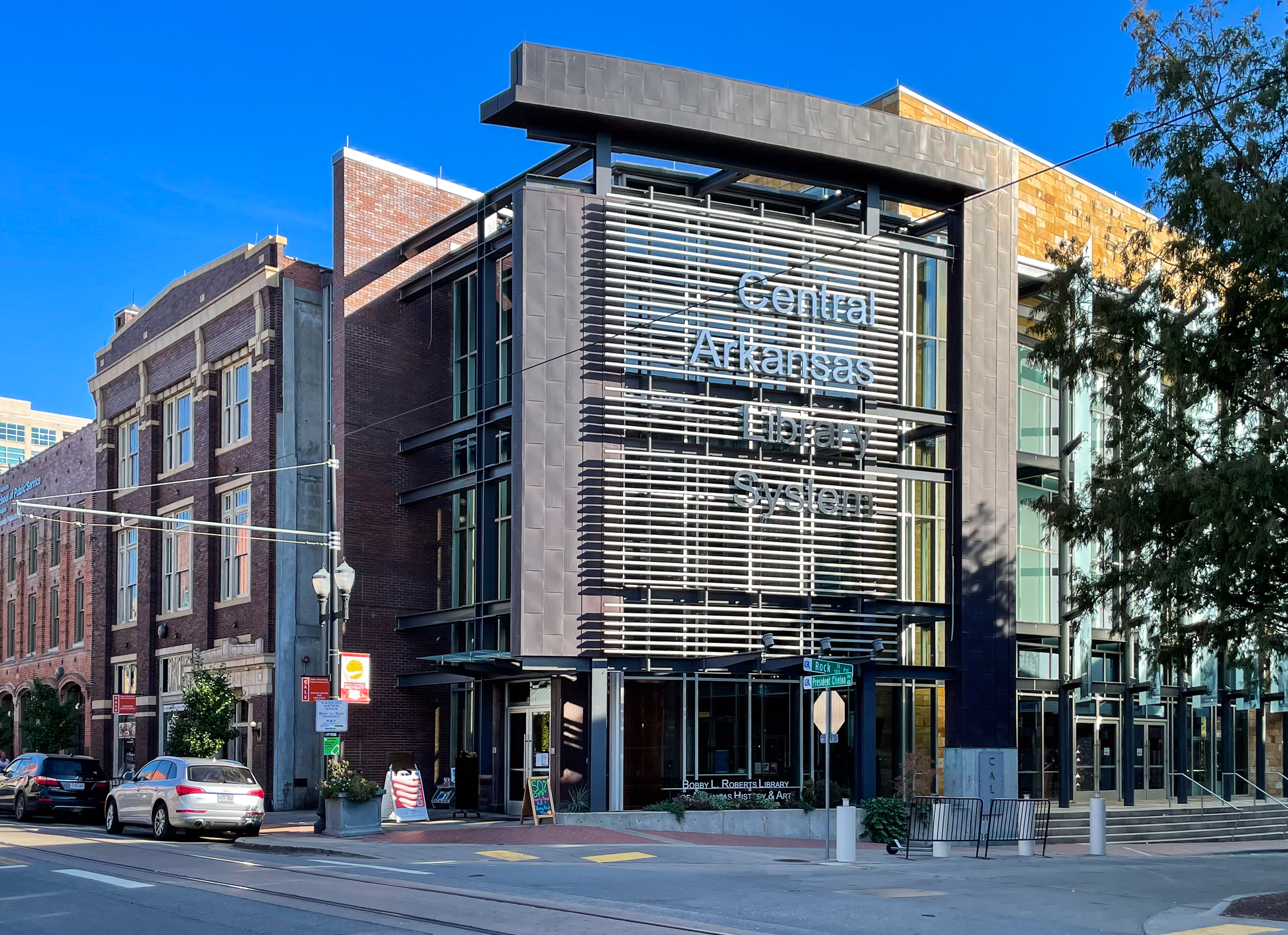
- Bobby L. Roberts Library of Arkansas History & Art in Little Rock
- 34°44′49″N 92°16′02″W
- Type: Public library system
- Service area: Central Arkansas

Other information
- Website: cals.org

Central Arkansas Library System (CALS) is a public library system headquartered in Little Rock, Arkansas, United States.

The largest public library system in Arkansas, the Central Arkansas Library System serves all residents of Pulaski and Perry County, including Little Rock, Jacksonville, Maumelle, Perryville, Sherwood, and Wrightsville.

The library in downtown Little Rock is the main branch of the system. The Main Library campus also includes the Arkansas Studies Institute Building, which includes the offices of the Butler Center for Arkansas Studies, the Encyclopedia of Arkansas, and the UALR Center for Arkansas History and Culture. CALS' Ron Robinson Theater, Cox Creative Center, and River Market Books & Gifts are also located on the Main Library campus.

== History ==
The first Little Rock Public Library was one of four Carnegie Libraries in Arkansas. The Carnegie Corporation of New York made a grant of $50,000 in 1906, and increased the grant to $88,100 in 1907. The library was opened on February 1, 1910, at West 7th Street and South Louisiana Street in downtown Little Rock.

Adolphine Fletcher Terry was an early proponent of public libraries in Central Arkansas. Her advocacy led to her being trustee at what was then-known as the Little Rock Public Library from 1925 to 1965. In the Library Commission's 1975-77 Biennial Report she wrote, "if you want to start something new, don't hesitate. If you have the proper tools to work with, good; if you have nothing but a forked stick, go ahead anyway. Make your brains provide what you otherwise lack."

Terry's brother was the noted poet John Gould Fletcher. His wife, Charlie May Simon, was also a Little Rock Public Library trustee, as well as serving as the president of the Arkansas Federation of Women's Clubs. Both Adolphine Fletcher Terry and Fletcher would later have Central Arkansas Library System branch libraries named after them.

In the early years, librarians were paid $52.50 a month. These funds came from the Works Progress Administration (WPA).

The Central Arkansas Library System (CALS) was born of a 1975 merger agreement between the trustees of the Little Rock Public Library and of the Pulaski-Perry Regional Library; the trustees of the North Little Rock Public Library, now known as the William F. Laman Public Library, chose not to join CALS.

Today, the Central Arkansas Library System, with its headquarters at the Main Library, serves a local population of 402,853. Nine of CALS' fourteen branches are located in Little Rock, with additional branches located in Jacksonville, Maumelle, Perryville, Sherwood, and Wrightsville. Through the Gateway Project, residents of Arkansas, Bradley, Chicot, Clark, Cleburne, Cleveland, Conway, Dallas, Desha, Drew, Faulkner, Garland, Grant, Hot Spring, Jackson, Jefferson, Lincoln, Lonoke, Montgomery, Nevada, Perry, Pike, Polk, Pope, Prairie, Pulaski, Saline, Van Buren, and White counties may also access the 1.5 million items in CALS' collection for $54 per year. In 2015, the Central Arkansas Library System welcomed over 2 million visitors, while cardholders checked out over 2.7 million items.

== Architecture ==
The Main Library is part of a complex of renovated buildings in downtown Little Rock. The Main Library building was originally a hardware warehouse in the early 1900s. In 1997, the building was completely refurbished as a library. The updated building served as the centerpiece of the River Market District.

Soon after the opening of the Main library, the neighboring property was similarly re-purposed by the library system. The Thomas Cox & Sons Machinery Company's warehouse was from the same time period. CALS opened the Cox Creative Center, which houses a used book and gift store, a coffee shop and bakery, three art galleries, and meeting rooms. The 18,600 square foot building has been renamed the Bookstore at Library Square.

These two buildings, along with the Dee Brown branch, earned the then-director of CALS the Award of Merit by the American Institute of Architects (IAI) in 2002.

The 63,000 square foot CALS Bobby L. Roberts Library of Arkansas History & Art (formerly the Arkansas Studies Institute) was constructed from 2006 to 2009. The architect was Polk Stanley Rowland Curzon Porter Architects.

== Branches ==
- Little Rock
  - Dee Brown Library, named for the author of Bury My Heart at Wounded Knee
  - Hillary Clinton Children's Library, named for the former first lady of Arkansas
  - John Gould Fletcher Library, named for the Pulitzer prize-winning poet, the younger brother of Adolphine Fletcher Terry
  - Sidney S. McMath Library, named for the state's former governor
  - Main Library
  - Oley E. Rooker Library, named for an advocate for southwest Little Rock
  - Adolphine Fletcher Terry Library, named for an advocate for schools, libraries, and desegregation in the state, the older sister of John Gould Fletcher
  - Roosevelt Thompson Library, named for a Little Rock native and Yale student who received a Rhodes Scholarship but was killed before he could begin it
  - Sue Cowan Williams Library, named for a Little Rock schoolteacher who won a 1942 lawsuit seeking equal pay for black teachers
- Jacksonville
  - Esther Dewitt Nixon Library, named for the first librarian for the Jacksonville Library
- Maumelle:
  - Maumelle Public Library
- Perryville:
  - Max Milam Library, named for the chair of the Political Science department at the University of Arkansas, and an advocate for rural health care delivery and rural economic development in Arkansas
- Sherwood:
  - Amy Sanders Library, named for a long-time clerk for the city of Sherwood
- Wrightsville:
  - Millie Brooks Library, named for an advocate and city councilwoman for Wrightsville

=== Specialized facilities ===
- Butler Center for Arkansas Studies, publisher of the Encyclopedia of Arkansas History & Culture (EOA)
- Cox Creative Center
- Ron Robinson Theater

== See also ==
- Arkansas lunar sample displays
