= Vivion group =

Real estate company based in Luxembourg

Vivion Investments S.à r.l. is a real estate company based in Luxembourg. The company's portfolio includes hotels and office buildings in Germany and hotels in the United Kingdom. The market value of the portfolio is 2.9 billion euros.

== History ==
The group was founded in 2008. Vivion Holdings was founded in 2018 as Société à responsabilité limitée, in order to realign its orientation on the international capital market. The portfolio comprises around 100 properties, most of them office buildings and hotels.

In 2019, Vivion entered the capital market, raising €700 million in August, and €300 million in October, for its UK and German property portfolios, with €4 billion in corporate bonds. Investors included JPMorgan Chase, Goldman Sachs and Citibank.

In February 2021, it was reported that Vivion bonds were the most shorted in Europe according to IHS Markit. In December 2022, Muddy Waters Research released a report on why it was shorting Vivion.

== Ownership structure ==
The majority of the beneficial owners of Vivion Holdings are the Israeli Dayan family, and other international institutional investors.
