= Butler Center for Arkansas Studies =

Cultural and historical organization in Little Rock, Arkansas

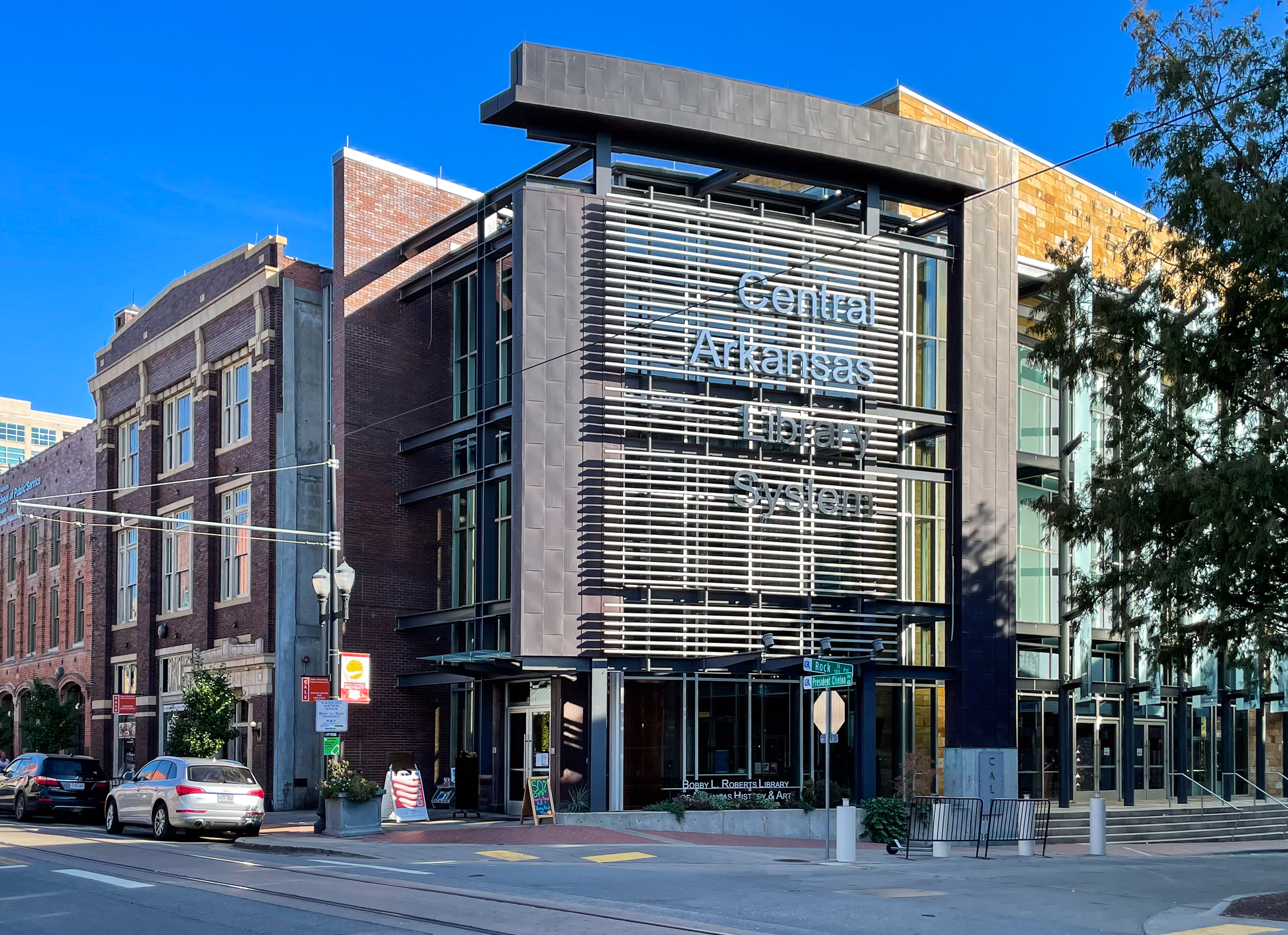
The Butler Center is housed in the Bobby L. Roberts Library of Arkansas History & Art

The mission of the Butler Center for Arkansas Studies (est. 1997) is to promote "a greater understanding and appreciation of Arkansas history, literature, art, and culture." Named after Richard C. Butler Sr., a noted Little Rock lawyer and philanthropist, the primary function of the Butler Center is as a research library and historical archive, specializing in Arkansas related materials. The offices and collections of the Butler Center are located in the Bobby L. Roberts Library of Arkansas History & Art in Little Rock.

In addition, the Butler Center manages an online repository of Arkansas history called The Encyclopedia of Arkansas History & Culture at the Central Arkansas Library System. Other projects of the Butler Center include the Arkansas Sounds Music Series, featuring live performances by musicians with ties to Arkansas; Radio CALS, a weekly radio show featuring music, lectures, and oral histories from the Butler Center collections; and the Arkansas Studies Institute, a joint project providing researchers access to the collections of the Butler Center and the University of Arkansas at Little Rock's Center for Arkansas History and Culture. The Butler Center also operates four art exhibition spaces, as well as a contemporary art store featuring the work of Arkansas artists.
