= Vivion Brewer =

Vivion Mercer Lenon Brewer
- Born: October 6, 1900; Little Rock, Arkansas, U.S.
- Died: June 18, 1991 (aged 90); Sierra Madre, California, U.S.
- Occupations: Banker; activist; author
- Spouse: Joseph Brewer (1930–1991)

Vivion Mercer Lenon Brewer (October 6, 1900 – June 18, 1991) was an American desegregationist, most notable for being a founding member of the Women's Emergency Committee to Open Our Schools (WEC) in 1958 during the desegregation of Little Rock Central High School in Little Rock, Arkansas.

== Early life and education ==
Vivion Brewer was born Vivion Lenon to Warren and Clara (Mercer) Lenon, in Little Rock on October 6, 1900. She graduated from what is now Little Rock Central High School in 1917, and attended Smith College in Northampton, Massachusetts, graduating in 1921 with a major in sociology. In 1926, she enrolled in the Arkansas Law School in Little Rock while working for her father’s bank in Little Rock. She graduated in 1928.

== Desegregation work ==
During the Little Rock Crisis in 1957, Arkansas Governor Orval Faubus called out the Arkansas National Guard to prevent nine African-American students from entering Central High School. In the fall of 1958, Little Rock’s citizens voted to close the city’s high schools rather than desegregate all of the city’s schools. Brewer joined with Adolphine Fletcher Terry to organize the WEC in September 1958. Brewer initially suggested working with African-American women to help better understand race relations in the city, but the WEC members decided that they needed to focus solely on reopening the schools in order to deflect segregationist criticism. Brewer took the lead in dealing with the media for the WEC and, because of her highly visible position in the WEC, quickly became the target of segregationists, often receiving threatening and offensive telephone calls and mail. In her memoir, she recalled some reluctance serving as the WEC’s chairperson because she did not reside in Little Rock and her only child had not lived to school age. The schools reopened in the fall of 1959, and Brewer resigned as chairperson of the WEC in 1960.

== Later life and death ==
Smith College awarded Brewer an honorary doctorate of humane letters in 1961 for her work during the school crisis. She died on June 18, 1991, in Sierra Madre, California, where she lived for the last three years of her life. She is buried in Roselawn Memorial Park in Little Rock.

== Personal life ==
In 1930, she married Joseph Brewer, nephew of Arkansas Senator Joseph Taylor Robinson, and moved to Washington D.C., with her husband, where he held positions in the federal government; she also acted as a secretary to his uncle for a time. They returned to Arkansas in 1946 and settled in Scott, Arkansas.

== Additional information ==
- Vivion Lenon Brewer Papers, 1900-1991, Sophia Smith Collection, Smith College.
- Vivion Brewer and the 1957 Little Rock Central High crisis, University of Arkansas by Michelle Leslie Davidson
