= John Gould Fletcher =

American poet and winner of the Pulitzer

John Gould Fletcher

John Gould Fletcher (January 3, 1886 – May 10, 1950) was an Imagist poet (the first Southern poet to win the Pulitzer Prize), author and authority on modern painting. He was born in Little Rock, Arkansas, to a socially prominent family. After attending Phillips Academy, Andover, Fletcher went on to Harvard University from 1903 to 1907, but dropped out shortly after his father's death.

== Background ==
Fletcher lived in England for a large portion of his life. While in Europe he associated with Amy Lowell, Ezra Pound, and other Imagist poets; he was one of the six Imagists who adopted the name and stuck to it until their aims were achieved. Fletcher resumed a liaison with Florence Emily "Daisy" Arbuthnot (née Goold) at her house in Kent. She had been married to Malcolm Arbuthnot and Fletcher's adultery with her was the grounds for the divorce. The couple married on July 5, 1916. The marriage produced no children, but Arbuthnot's son and daughter from her previous marriage lived with the couple, who later divorced.

On January 18, 1936, Fletcher married a noted author of children's books, Charlie May Simon. The two of them built "Johnswood", a residence on the bluffs of the Arkansas River, then outside Little Rock. They traveled frequently to New York for the intellectual stimulation, and to the American West and South for the climate, after Fletcher developed chronic arthritis.

Fletcher suffered from depression, and on May 10, 1950, died by suicide by drowning himself in a pond near his home in Little Rock, Arkansas. Fletcher is buried at historic Mount Holly Cemetery in Little Rock. A branch of the Central Arkansas Library System is named in his honor.

== Poetry ==
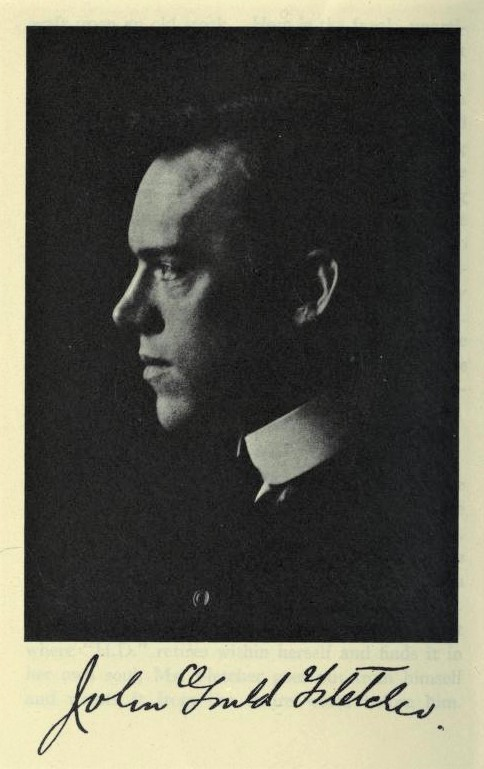
Fletcher circa 1917

In 1913 Ezra Pound in his New Freewoman review commended Fletcher for the individuality of rhythm in his first volume of poems. Those early works include Irradiations: Sand and Spray (1915), and Goblins and Pagodas (1916). Amy Lowell said of him, "No one is more absolute master of the rhythm of verse libre". Fletcher invented the term 'polyphonic prose' to describe some poetic experiments of Amy Lowell, a form he experimented with in Goblins & Pagodas. In later poetic works Fletcher returned to more traditional forms. These include The Black Rock (1928), Selected Poems (1938), for which he won the Pulitzer Prize for Poetry in 1939, "South Star" published by Macmillan (1941), and The Burning Mountain (1946). Fletcher later moved back to Arkansas to reconnect with his roots. The subject of his works turned increasingly towards Southern issues and traditionalism.

In the late 1920s and 1930s Fletcher was active with a group of Southern writers and poets known as the Southern Agrarians. This group published the classic Agrarian manifesto I'll Take My Stand, a collection of essays rejecting Modernity and Industrialism. In 1937 he wrote his autobiography, Life is My Song, and in 1947 he published Arkansas, a history of his home state.

Fletcher attended several residencies at the MacDowell Colony between 1936 and 1943.

Johnswood, his Little Rock home, is listed on the National Register of Historic Places.

== Writings ==
=== Poetry ===
- The Book of Nature (1913)
- The Dominant City (1911-1912), (1913)
- Fire and Wine (1913)
- Fool’s Gold (1913)
- Visions of the Evening (1913)
- Irradiations: Sand and Spray, Boston, Houghton Mifflin Co., 1915
- Goblins and Pagodas, Boston, Houghton Mifflin Co., 1916
- Japanese Prints, Four Seas, 1918, LC 18017484
- The Tree of Life, London, Chattus Windus, 1918
- Breakers and Granite, New York, MacMillan Co., 1921
- The Black Rock, New York, MacMillan Co., 1928
- Preludes and Symphonies, Macmillan, 1930 ISBN 978-1-4255-0347-5
- XXIV Elegies, Writers' Editions, Santa Fe, 1935
- South Star, New York, MacMillan Co., 1941
- The Burning Mountain, (1946)

=== Prose ===
- Paul Gauguin, His Life and Art, N. L. Brown, 1921, LC 20114210
- John Smith — Also Pocahontas, (1928)
- The Crisis of the Film, (1930)
- The Two Frontiers: A Study in Historical Psychology, (1930)
- Arkansas, (1947)

=== Memoir ===
- Life Is My Song: The Autobiography Of John Gould Fletcher (1937), Farrar & Rinehart

=== Translations ===
- The Dance Over Fire and Water
- Reveries of a Solitary
