= Ethnic hatred =

Feelings and acts of prejudice and hostility towards an ethnic group

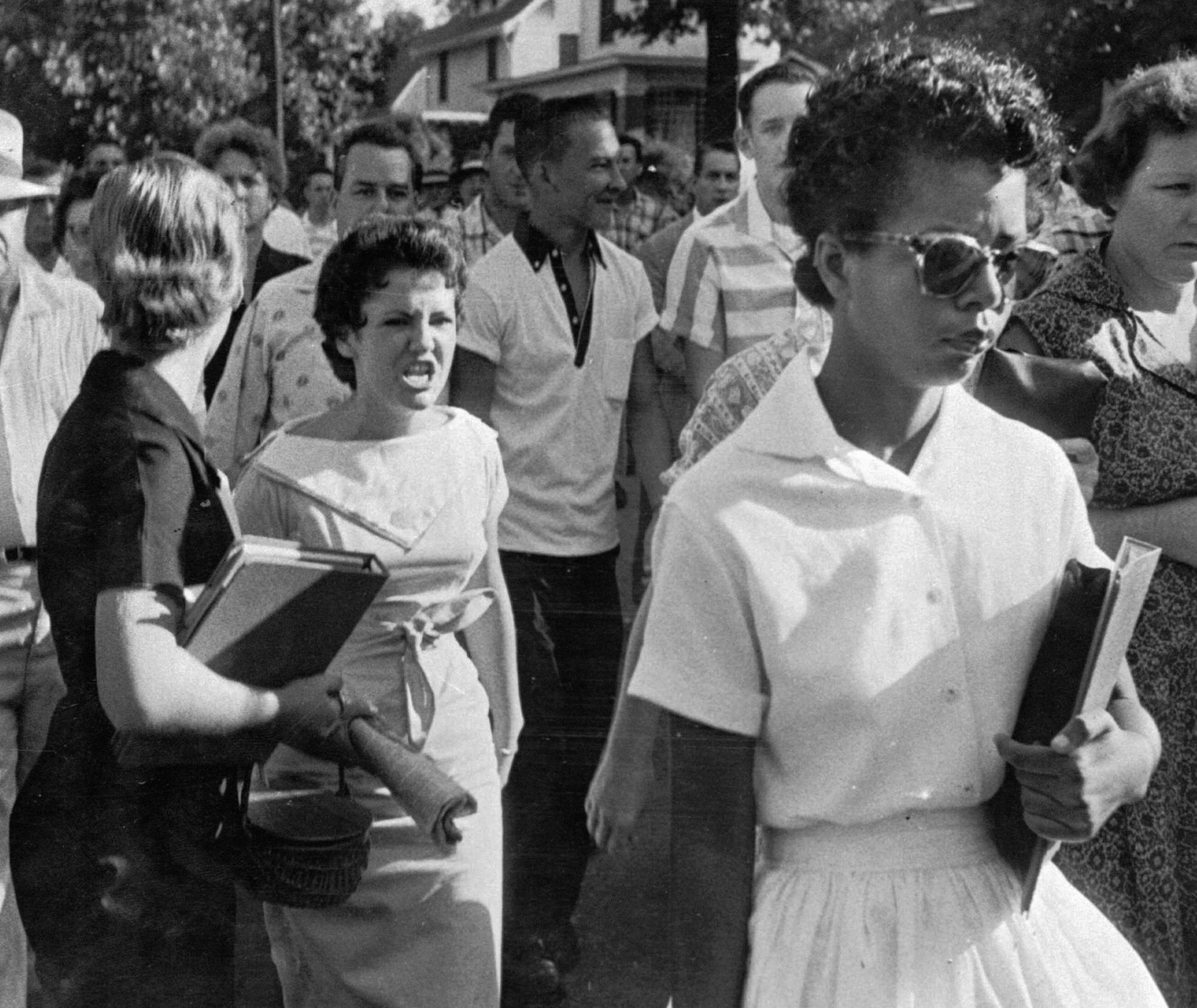
Hazel Massery yelling at Elizabeth Eckford in a display of racial hatred in 1957.

Ethnic hatred, inter-ethnic hatred, racial hatred, or ethnic tension refers to notions and acts of prejudice and hostility towards an ethnic group to varying degrees.

It is a form of racial prejudice, based on ethnic origin or region of origin. It can be accompanied by the systematic oppression of the ethnic minority group. Unlike under assimilationism, the ethnicity is often in physical danger (confrontations, dehumanization, pogroms, lynchings, massacres), and can be targeted by apartheid, general hostility or property vandalism. In special cases forced labour, deportation, revocation of human rights, and property looting.

There are multiple origins of ethnic hatred and the resulting ethnic conflicts. In some societies, it is rooted in tribalism, and in other societies, it originates in a history of non-peaceful co-existence and the resulting actual disputed issues. In many countries, incitement to ethnic or racial hatred is a criminal offense. Frequently, ethnic conflict is stoked by nationalist fervor and sentiments of national superiority—for which reason, inter-ethnic hatred borders on racism, and frequently, the two terms are conflated.

Often the minority itself can identify with the nationalism of the majority, claiming to be of different origins but the same nationality (see Neology). The ethnicist narrative often uses stereotypes and predeterministic roles. It can stem from ethnic nationalism. It cannot be compared to nativism, as the question of nationality is definition-dependent. While racism, scientific racism and colorism are based on appearances and the concept of race, ethnicism is instead based on nationalist historical commentary. However, the border between ethnicism and racism are sometimes hard to define, for example, the Hispanic community can defined as both a race and ethnicity.

Various political leaders have exploited and even fueled ethnic hatred in the service of their desire to consolidate their power or make electoral gains by calling for the formation of a united front against a common enemy (real or imaginary).

An example of ethnic hatred is the reported animosity towards the Romani people in Europe. The Romani people, also known as Gypsies, are one of the most marginalized and persecuted ethnic groups in Europe. Jews are also a group typically targeted by right-wing propaganda, both for their ethnicity and religion.

== Role of the media ==
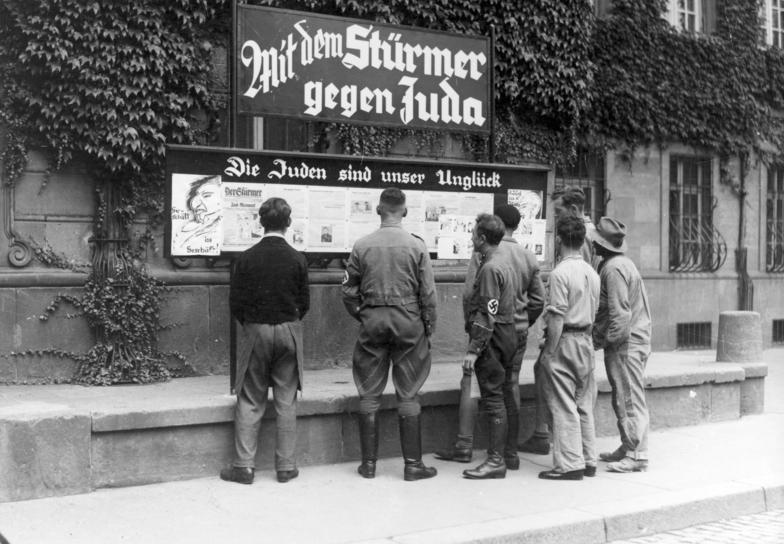
Public reading of the antisemitic newspaper Der Stürmer, Worms, Germany, 1935

Media persuasion plays a role in the dissemination of ethnic hatred. A media presence spreads underlying messages that negatively portrays certain ethnic groups in the eyes of the public. For example, political elites use media exposure to influence the opinions of the viewers towards a certain propaganda. In Nazi Germany in the 1930s, the media's presence in exposing propaganda in terms of hatred was effectively organized by Joseph Goebbels. Although recent US data (Berelson, Lazarsfeld, and McPhee 1954; Lazarsfeld, Berelson, and Gaudet 1944) shows media as a tool that does not carry "significant independent influence," media "strengthens people's predispositions." Furthermore, exogenous variation plays a role in utilizing media content towards escalating ethnic hatred presence according to recent economic studies. The effects of media on people varies in different platforms strengthening mass medias influence towards the public. Data polled from Muslim countries shows that exposure to Al-Jazeera is associated with higher levels of reported anti-Americanism in contrast to exposure to CNN associating with less anti-Americanism.

There are two types of persuasion: direct and indirect. Direct persuasion with regard to mass media exponentially expands hatred that leads to violence against ethnic groups. Indirect persuasion exports hatred and directs behavior towards the execution of violence.

The continuous use of mass media as an apparatus to spread negative image of ethnic groups is seen throughout history. Most media hate speech that amplified worldwide attention are experienced in Rwanda and Yugoslavia. Also, media's control of hate speech that Nazi and fascist parties manipulate agitate and attract followers into advocating for hatred and violence. Today, social media plays a role in ethnic conflicts in Kenya. Ethnicity is a big part in determining voting patterns in Kenya; however, many associate ethnicity with grievances that mobilize patterns of differences, hatred, and violence.

== Propaganda ==
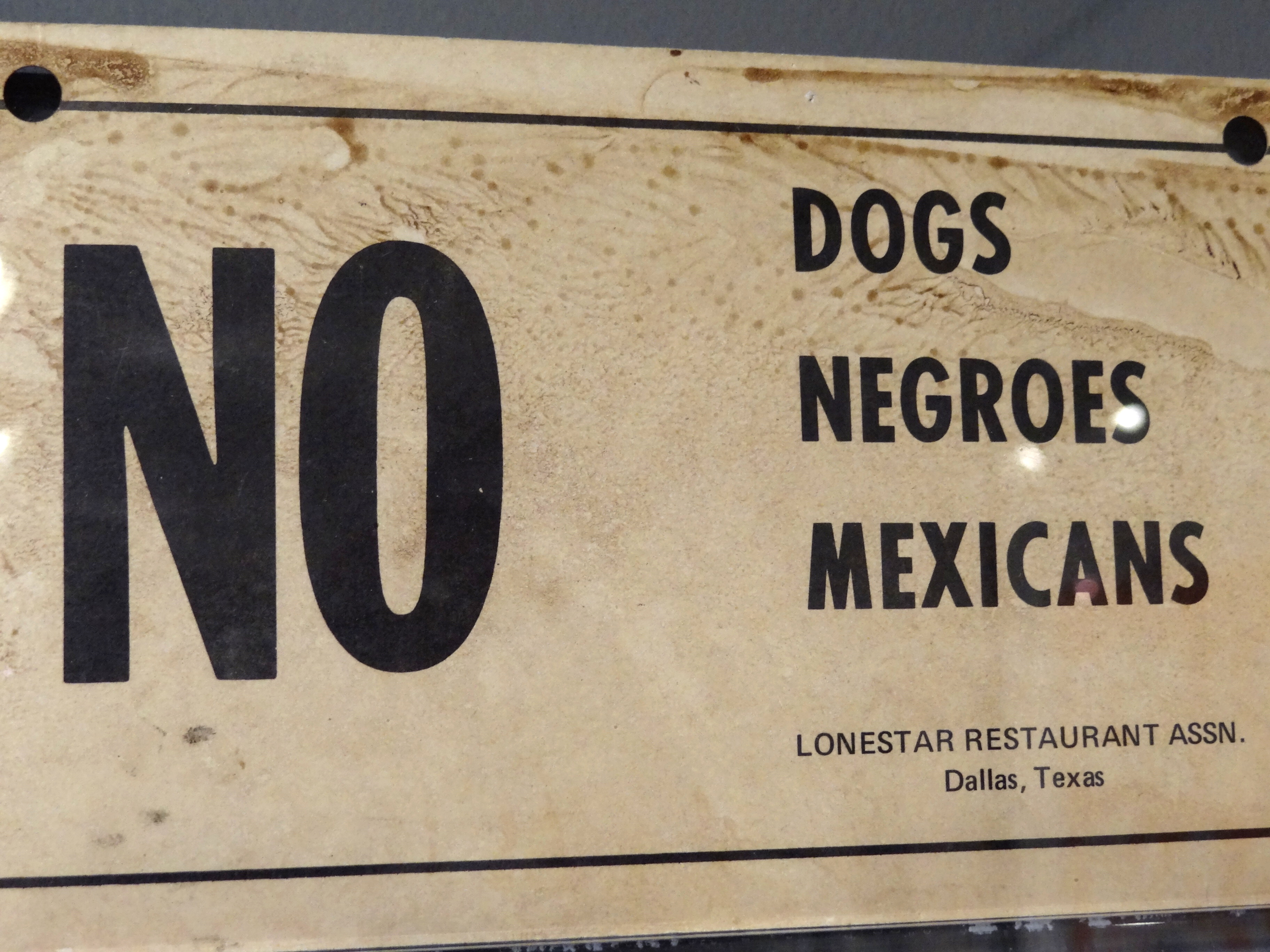
"No Dogs, Negroes, Mexicans" was a policy enforced by the Lonestar Restaurant Association throughout Texas, discriminating against ethnic Mexicans.

Along with mass media, propaganda plays as much role in distributing messages in terms of ethnic hatred. Propaganda is highly associated with totalitarian regimes in the twentieth century such as Nineteen Eighty-Four and Animal Farm by George Orwell that paved a way of commentating the regimes during the time. However, propaganda is dangerous when utilized negatively. In original meaning, propaganda promotes beliefs leading towards action. Alternatively, Jowett and O'Donnell define propaganda as "deliberate, systematic attempt to shape perceptions, manipulate cognitions, and direct behavior to achieve a response that furthers the desired intent of the propagandist". The definition shows self-interested manipulation – an assumption that is difficult to prove. Negatively, propaganda presents "organised myth" that limits the chance of discovering the truth. The utilization of propaganda by Stalin, Hitler and Mussolini popularize the false impression of propaganda that hid the truth for an extended time. In addition, there are complex influences that emerged during the propaganda campaigns of the Great War (1914-18) and Russian Revolution (1917) such as telegraphs, newspapers, photography, radio, film, large corporations seeking new markets, rise of reform-minded journalism, and the influence of art movements, psychology, sociology, and marketing. The variation of propaganda and psychological warfare are essentially organized processes of persuasion.

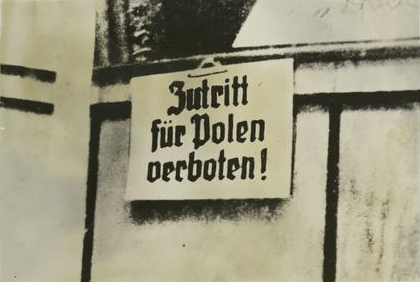
German warning in Nazi-occupied Poland, 1939 – "No entrance for Poles!"

However, empirical research casts doubt on the role of propaganda in inciting hatred, finding that it is much less able to change minds than is often assumed. For example, a 2017 review of literature says: "First, propaganda often fails. To take the example of Nazi propaganda, it failed to generate support for euthanasia of the handicapped (Kershaw, 1983a; Kuller, 2015), it largely failed to turn people into rabid anti-Semites (Kershaw, 1983b; Voigtländer & Voth, 2015), it failed to generate much liking for the Nazi party (Kershaw, 1983b, 1987), and it soon failed to make Germans more optimistic about the outcome of the war (Kallis, 2008; Kershaw, 1983a; for similar examples regarding Stalinist propaganda, see Brandenberger, 2012; Davies, 1997; Maoist propaganda, see Wang, 1995; North Korean propaganda, see B. R. Myers, 2011).

== See also ==
- Anti-Romani sentiment
- Antisemitism
- Discrimination
- Domicide
- Ethnic cleansing
- Ethnic violence
- Ethnocentrism
- Ethnocide
- Fundamentalism
- Genocide
- Hate crime
- Hispanophobia
- Islamophobia
- Nativism
- Oppression
- Persecution
- Racism
- Religious discrimination
- Religious fanaticism
- Religious intolerance
- Religious persecution
- Religious segregation
- Religious violence
- Sectarianism
- Sectarian violence
- Supremacism
- World on Fire
- Xenophobia
