= Vivienne Malone-Mayes =

American mathematician and professor (1932–1995)

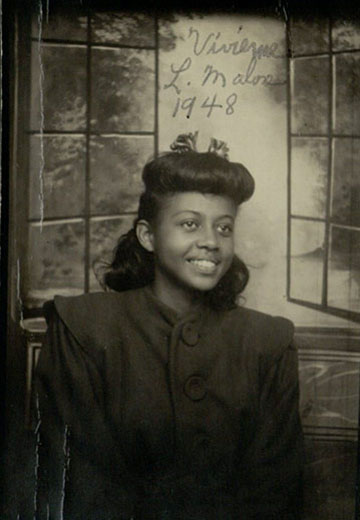
- Born: Vivienne Lucille Malone; February 10, 1932; Waco, Texas, U.S.
- Died: June 9, 1995 (aged 63); Waco, Texas, U.S.
- Education: Fisk University; University of Texas
- Known for: First African-American full-time mathematics professor at Baylor University
- Spouse: James Mayes (m. 1952)
- Children: 1
- Scientific career
- Fields: Mathematics
- Workplaces: Paul Quinn College; Baylor University

Vivienne Lucille Malone-Mayes (née Malone; February 10, 1932 – June 9, 1995) was an American mathematician and professor. Malone-Mayes studied properties of functions, as well as methods of teaching mathematics. She was the fifth African-American woman to gain a PhD in mathematics in the United States, and the first African-American member of the faculty of Baylor University.

== Early life and education ==
Vivienne Lucille Malone was born on February 10, 1932, in Waco, Texas, to Pizarro and Vera Estelle Allen Malone. She encountered educational challenges associated with growing up in an African-American community in the South, including racially segregated schools, but the encouragement of her parents, both educators, led her to avidly pursue her own education.

She graduated from A. J. Moore High School in 1948. She entered Fisk University at the age of 16 where she earned a bachelor's degree (1952) and a master's degree (1954). Vivienne switched from medicine to mathematics after she began studying under Evelyn Boyd Granville and Lee Lorch. Granville was one of the first of five African-American women to earn her Ph.D. in mathematics.

== Career ==
After earning her master's, she chaired the Mathematics department at Paul Quinn College for seven years and then at Bishop College for one year before deciding to take further graduate mathematics course. She was refused admission at Baylor University due to segregation and instead attend summer courses at the University of Texas. After another year of teaching she decided to attend the University of Texas full-time as a graduate student. She was the only African American and only woman in the class, and at first her classmates ignored her. She was not allowed to teach, was unable to attend professor Robert Lee Moore's lectures, and could not join off-campus meetings because they were held in a coffee shop which could not, under Texas law, serve African Americans. She wrote, "My mathematical isolation was complete", and that "it took a faith in scholarship almost beyond measure to endure the stress of earning a Ph.D. degree as a Black, female graduate student".

She participated in civil rights demonstrations, and her friends and colleagues Etta Falconer and Lee Lorch wrote on her death that "With skill, integrity, steadfastness and love she fought racism and sexism her entire life, never yielding to the pressures or problems which beset her path".

As an educator, Malone-Mayes's developed novel methods of teaching mathematics including a program using self-paced audio-tutorials. Her mathematical research was in the field of functional analysis, particularly characterizing the growth properties of ranges of nonlinear operators. Malone-Mayes graduated in 1966, with a dissertation entitled "A structure problem in asymptotic analysis".

Following graduation, Malone-Mayes was hired as a full-time professor in the mathematics department at Baylor University. Her research there continued to focus on functional analysis; of her two papers, one studies summability methods for the moment problem as operators on sequence spaces and the other studies the long-term behavior of a certain linear ordinary differential equation.

Nonetheless, her research was sufficiently innovative for her to qualify for federal grants to support her work, and the latter paper was published in the prestigious Proceedings of the American Mathematical Society. She was soon a full professor.

Malone-Mayes had a successful, lengthy career and served on several boards and committees of note, retiring in 1994 due to ill health. She was the fifth African-American woman to be allowed in the White House.

== Memberships ==
She was a member of the board of directors of the National Association of Mathematicians; she was also elected Director-at-large for the Texas section of Mathematical Association of America and served as director of the High School Lecture Program for the Texas section.

She was also active in her local community as a lifetime member and musician of New Hope Baptist Church. She served on boards of directors for Cerebral Palsy, Goodwill Industries, and Family Counseling and Children and was on the Texas State Advisory Council for Construction of Community Mental Health Centers. She also served on the board of the Heart of Texas Region Mental Health and Mental Retardation Center.

Vivienne Malone-Mayes was a member of Delta Sigma Theta sorority and served as President of Waco Alumnae Chapter.

== Legacy and awards ==
After Lillian K. Bradley in 1960, Malone-Mayes became one of the first African-American women to receive a PhD in mathematics from University of Texas (and fifth African-American woman in the United States). She was the first African-American member of the faculty at Baylor University, and was also the first African-American person elected to Executive Committee of the Association of Women in Mathematics.

The student congress of Baylor voted her the "Outstanding Faculty Member of the Year" in 1971.

== Personal ==
Malone married James Mayes in 1952, and had a daughter, Patsyanne Mayes Wheeler.

Malone-Mayes died of a heart attack, in Waco, on June 9, 1995, at the age of 63. She is buried in Greenwood Cemetery.

== Sources ==
- Notable Women in Mathematics, a Biographical Dictionary, edited by Charlene Morrow and Teri Perl, Greenwood Press, 1998, pp. 133–137.
