= Will Counts =

American photojournalist (1931–2001)

- Born: Ira Wilmer Counts Jr. August 24, 1931; Little Rock, Arkansas, U.S.
- Died: October 6, 2001 (aged 70); Little Rock, Arkansas, U.S.
- Occupation: Photojournalist

Ira Wilmer Counts Jr. (August 24, 1931 — October 6, 2001), known as Will Counts, was an American photojournalist most known for drawing the nation's attention to the desegregation crisis that was happening at Little Rock Central High School in Little Rock, Arkansas in 1957. Documenting the integration effort in the 1950s, he captured the harassment and violence that African Americans in the South were facing at this time. He was nominated for the Pulitzer Prize for these photographs.

== Early life ==
Will Counts was born in Little Rock on August 24, 1931. During the Depression he, his brother, and his parents (Ira Counts Sr. and Jeanne Frances Adams Counts) were sharecroppers in White County, outside the town of Rose Bud and in Lonoke County, outside of Cabot, before they relocated in 1936 to the Plum Bayou Homesteads, a New Deal project, in Jefferson County. Later, the family returned to Little Rock where Counts attended Little Rock High School (now Central High). It was there that his journalism teacher, Edna Middlebrook, spurred his interest in photography.

During his junior year, Counts asked his mother for a Speed Graphic camera for Christmas after he had seen one advertised in Boys' Life magazine. However, with his father still away fighting in World War II, his mother could only afford to buy a Kodak Brownie Hawkeye.

== Education ==
By the time Counts started at Arkansas State Teachers College (now the University of Central Arkansas) in 1949, he knew he wanted to be a news journalist. He eventually became a photographer for the college. Around the same time, he was freelancing for the Arkansas Gazette and the Arkansas Democrat. In 1952, he received a BA in education. In 1954, he received his master's degree in education and audio-visual communications at Indiana University (IU). Fifteen years later, Counts earned his doctorate in education at IU.

== Career ==
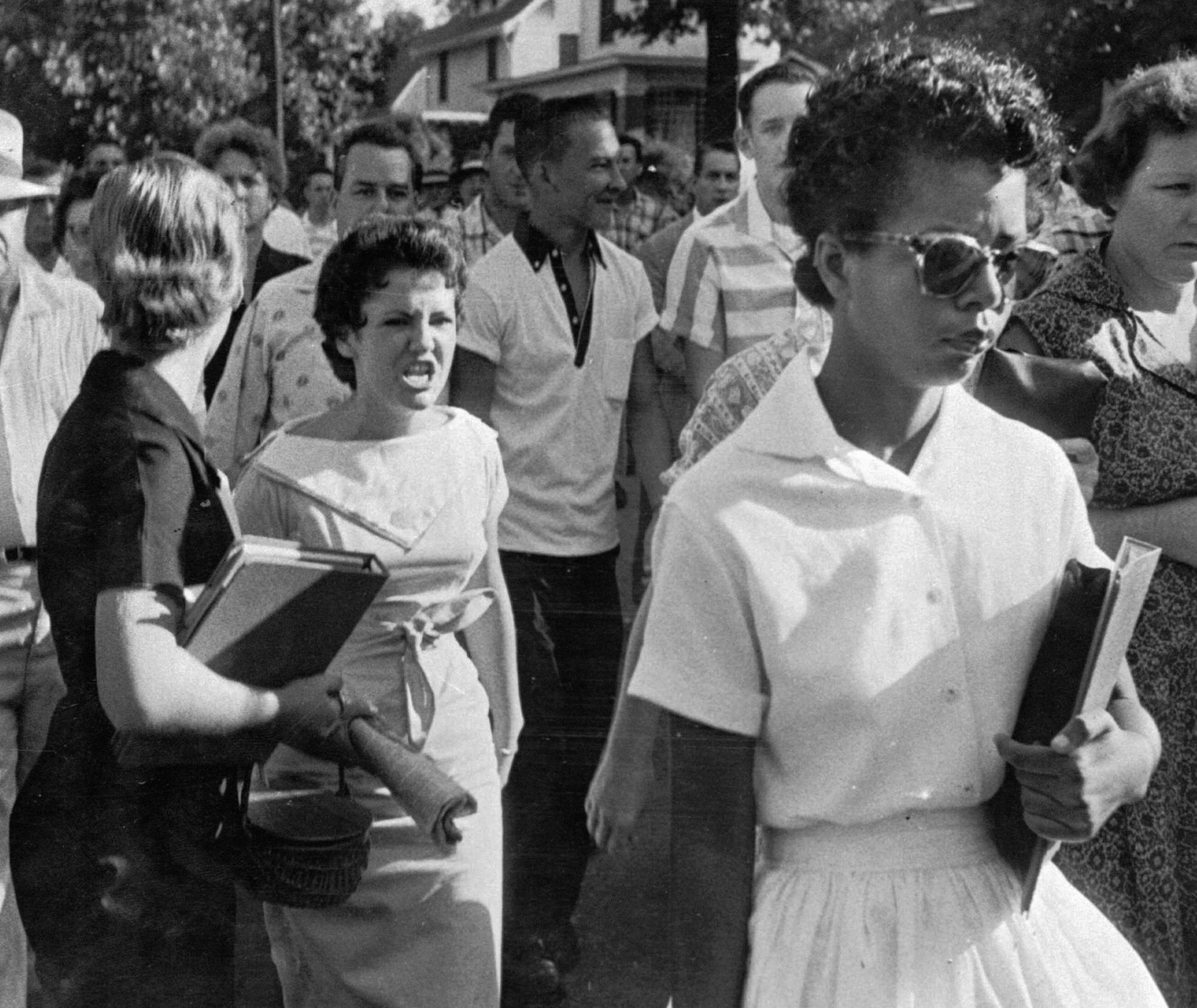
Counts's photograph of Hazel Bryan yelling at Elizabeth Eckford

While pursuing his master's degree in Bloomington, Indiana, he was production supervisor at the IU audiovisual center. In 1957, he moved back to Little Rock and was rehired by the Democrat as a staff photographer and editor of its Sunday magazine.

Counts was 26 when some of his most iconic images were published on September 4, 1957. Still a photographer for the Democrat, Counts captured white demonstrators and the National Guard gathering outside Central High. Despite the U.S. Supreme Court's ruling that "separate but equal" was unconstitutional, Arkansas Governor Orval Faubus had called the Guard to block integration. One of Counts' most famous images captures African-American Elizabeth Eckford being harassed by an angry white mob of students after being denied entrance at Central High. He recalled Eckford never losing her composure. "She just remained so dignified, so determined in what she was doing," he said. That photo, and four others that Counts shot on that day, were published on the front page of the Democrat. In his 1999 book, A Life is More Than a Moment, Counts details how he captured the shot. He states that he wore an inconspicuous red shirt and slacks while shooting to blend in with the crowd as a way to avoid looking like a journalist. He also notes that on his Nikon S2 camera, he used a wide-angled lens that gave him an advantage over other photographers. Others typically shot with large Speed Graphic press cameras that involved reloading the camera after each individual shot. Counts also shot many exposures to ensure a winning shot. His heavy bracketing approach was greatly inspired by Henri Cartier-Bresson who often shot many photographs of the same scene to ensure capturing the best representative shot. Eckford and Hazel Bryan Massery, one of the white students captured screaming at Eckford in one of Counts' iconic photos, met in 1997 when a reconciliation was organized by Counts and his wife, Vivian.

Only a few weeks after the famous photograph of Elizabeth Eckford was taken, Counts photographed black journalist Alex Wilson, a reporter for the Memphis-based Tri-State Defender, being kicked in the face by a brick-wielding white man while a crowd watched. This image, too, was captured in front of Central High School. The image shows Wilson doubled over, yet he clutches his hat in one hand. Wilson, later the editor of the Defender, told Counts that the hat was "the only piece of dignity I had." The mob trailed Wilson for a block and continued kicking him when he was down. Counts wrote in a story accompanying the photo that Wilson wanted to retain his dignity, and refused to fight back. Counts's picture made the front page of newspapers across the nation; it moved President Dwight Eisenhower, the next day, to federalize the Arkansas National Guard and send 1,000 members of the Army's 101st Airborne Division to Little Rock to ensure the school would be desegregated.

Hired in 1963, Counts taught photojournalism at Indiana University for 32 years. During this time, a period of explosive growth in Indiana's journalism department, Counts earned his doctorate and became Encyclopædia Britannica's expert on photojournalism.

In 1999, Counts published A Life is More Than a Moment. The title came from a line spoken to him by Hazel Massery, the same girl who is seen snarling and shouting at Elizabeth Eckford in his iconic 1957 photograph. Massery stated that she "deeply regretted the photograph for she had become the poster child of the hate generation." She apologized to Eckford years later and for a short time the two became friends.

Counts died of cancer in Bloomington, Indiana in 2001.

== Accomplishments ==
The Associated Press and the Arkansas Democrat entered Counts's images captured at Central High School for the 1957 Pulitzer Prize in news photography, and the Pulitzer Prize photography jury unanimously chose him as one of the nominees. But the Pulitzer board did not choose him as the winner, because three Pulitzers had already been awarded for Little Rock coverage. Counts won a first place award by the National Press Photographer's Association and first place in the spot news category for the fifteenth annual "News Picture of the Year Competition" for his photo of Alex Wilson. The image was also selected by the Encyclopædia Britannica as one of the world's fifty most memorable news photos in the last fifty years. The photograph was said to have led President Dwight D. Eisenhower to send federal troops to Little Rock, Arkansas to protect African Americans during the integration effort. Counts went on to work for the Associated Press. He developed some of the most renowned photojournalism departments in the United States and, in 1996, he was inducted in the Indiana Journalism Hall of Fame.

== Personal life ==
Counts and his wife, Vivian, lived in Bloomington. They had four children.

== Publications ==
- Will Counts, A Photographic Legacy, Ira Will Counts Jr., 1979
- Will Counts, The Magnificent 92: Indiana's Courthouses, Quarry Books (1991)
- Will Counts, Monroe County in Focus (1993)
- Will Counts, A Life is More than a Moment, Will Campbell, Ernest Dumas, Robert S. McCord, Indiana University Press (1996)
- Will Counts, Bloomington: Past and Present, Indiana University Press (2002)
- Will Counts and Jon Dilts. The Magnificent 92: Indiana Courthouses
