= The Ernest Green Story =

1993 television film directed by Eric Laneuville

- Movie cover
- Genre: Drama
- Written by: Lawrence Roman
- Directed by: Eric Laneuville
- Starring: Morris Chestnut; Monica Calhoun; Ossie Davis; Ruby Dee; Avery Brooks; CCH Pounder; Omar Gooding; Gary Grubbs; James Harper; Tina Lifford
- Music by: Mason Daring
- Country of origin: United States
- Original language: English

Production
- Executive producers: Carol Abrams; Adrienne Levin
- Producer: Jean Higgins
- Production location: Little Rock, Arkansas
- Cinematography: Félix Enríquez Alcalá
- Editor: Jeff Freeman
- Running time: 101 minutes
- Production company: Walt Disney Television

Original release
- Network: Disney Channel
- Release: January 17, 1993

The Ernest Green Story is a 1993 American made-for-television biographical film which follows the true story of Ernest Green (Morris Chestnut) and eight other African-American high-school students (dubbed the "Little Rock Nine") as they embark on their historic journey to integrate Little Rock Central High School in Little Rock, Arkansas, in 1957. The film was developed and executive produced by Carol Ann Abrams. Much of the movie was filmed on location at Central High School.

The film had its world premiere at Little Rock Central High School, with an introduction by President-Elect of the United States Bill Clinton. It aired on the Disney Channel on January 17, 1993. Later that year, A.M.L. Productions and the Disney Channel received a Peabody Award for presenting "a story which reminds adults and teaches children about the courageous steps taken toward the elimination of discrimination in American society".

== Plot ==
The movie begins with Ernest Green explaining how every morning on his ride to Horace Mann, the school for African-Americans, he would pass Little Rock Central High School, which would soon open its doors to nine African-American students. After the opening credits, the scene cuts to the office of the Governor of Arkansas, Orval Faubus, where he talks to the Reverend of the local white church about how he refuses to integrate the school because he believes integration is a state's right.

Meanwhile, in Ernest's neighborhood, his best friend, Marcus explains how Ernest can change the world by becoming class president at the recently integrated Central High. Ernest, who is worried about what may happen to him if he attends Central High, reminds Marcus of Crispus Attucks' story, telling him, "the first to defy is the first to die." Marcus persuades Ernest to attend the school by mentioning the school's luxurious facilities, including the lab, marveling at what discoveries George Washington Carver could have made in it. At dinner, Ernest's whole family, including his wise grandfather, support his decision and vow to stand by him whatever happens. Meanwhile, Governor Faubus vows to stop integration at Central High.

Ernest meets the other eight students who would, with him, become the Little Rock Nine, along with NAACP member Daisy Bates. They explain that many of their parents were concerned with their decision. They meet the principal and counselors of Central High. Ernest turns out to be the only senior and is therefore seen as a natural leader by Bates and the other members of the Little Rock Nine. The principal tells the Nine they are restricted from participating in any extracurricular activities, the first of many hardships they face at Central High. When Ernest gets home, his elderly neighbor is concerned about the negative attention he will receive at Central High after seeing him in the newspaper. Ernest's grandfather reminds her that Ernest is making a bold move to change the world and she should be happy about that.

On Ernest's first day at Central High, his family is very worried about him. The National Guard is in front of the school to keep the Little Rock Nine safe from the protesters outside. He and seven of the new African-American students are escorted to the school in a police car. But Elizabeth Eckford does not get the message, so she walks to school and gets physically beaten and called names by the mob outside. Soon after, she is escorted home on a bus. Later, the other Black students are denied entry by the National Guard, and turn back home. Bates hires attorney Thurgood Marshall to justify the Nine's right to attend Central High School. The Nine learn at home for the first three weeks of school, their assignments given to them by Bates. When Ernest and the other students are allowed back into Central High, Ernest's physics teacher, Mr. Loomis, treats him unfairly, disbelieving Ernest when he tries to tell his side of the story after conflicts with his white peers, and disbelieving that Ernest can be good at physics.

Despite harsh mistreatment, the Little Rock Nine continue to attend Central High School. Ernest makes friends with a white girl who shares his interest in jazz, but his grandfather forbids them from interacting, reminding Ernest of the story of Emmett Till. Ernest bumps into a prejudiced white girl, Charlene, and gets sent to the principal's office after she accuses him of trying to flirt with her. The white students continue to torment the Little Rock Nine, stealing Ernest's physics notes that he needs to pass his midterm exams. Despite his best efforts, Mr. Loomis gives him a failing grade in physics because Mr. Loomis believes Black people cannot be good at physics. Ernest's grandfather reminds him that he has the power to show Mr. Loomis that Ernest is more than his race.

Ernest's brother Scott runs off in the middle of the night to protect the streets from violence because he is scared of what is happening to Ernest and the other African-American students. Ernest tells him that Scott has got to be brave in order to stop the effects of hate.

The harsh treatment becomes more intense. Ernest gets cut on glass in the showers, Minnijean Brown, another African-American student, gets called names, and Elizabeth Eckford is knocked down the stairs. Minnijean stands up to the principal and gets expelled, Elizabeth breaks down, and Ernest tackles a bully and gets suspended because nobody believes he was acting in self-defense.

After a long battle for acceptance, the school year ends well for Ernest. He finally passes physics, having shown Mr. Loomis that he can excel at physics despite his race, and he graduates in the spring of 1958, despite criticism from white society. Overjoyed, his grandfather proudly takes pictures of him.

In the epilogue, Ernest notes that Little Rock Central High closed after he graduated to prevent further racial integration. He adds that he went on to work for the NAACP.

== Cast ==
- Morris Chestnut as Ernest Green
- CCH Pounder as Daisy Bates
- Gary Grubbs as Mr. Loomis
- Tina Lifford as Mrs. Green
- Avery Brooks as Rev. Lawson
- Ruby Dee as Mrs. Lydia Wilson
- Brian Stokes Mitchell as Thurgood Marshall
- Omar Gooding as Marcus
- James Harper as Arkansas Governor Orval Faubus
- Wayne Tippit as Principal Matthews
- Monica Calhoun as Minnijean Brown
- Suli McCullough as Terrence Roberts
- Lisa Marie Russell as Elizabeth Eckford
- Tico Wells as Jefferson Thomas
- Jacqueline Ann Shaw as Thelma Mothershed
- Jason Pratt as Scott Green
- Ossie Davis as Grandfather
- Francis Kemp as Grace Lorch
- Anitra Lovelace as Gloria Ray
- Sean Serino as Carlotta Walls
- Toya Stokes as Melba Pattillo
- Narrated by Ernest Green

== Reception ==
The movie generally gained positive reception from viewers. It is often shown in schools to teach students about the Little Rock Nine. In an interview given by young reporters from Arkansas, Ernest Green explained that the movie portrayed his year at Central High very accurately, highlighting the highs and lows of that year and bringing to light the most challenging and triumphant parts.

== See also ==
- Civil rights movement in popular culture
- Crisis at Central High

== Notes ==
- The original version of the movie includes gospel singer Mahalia Jackson's well-known rendition of the song, Take My Hand, Precious Lord. A subsequent version replaces the song with the hymn, It Is Well with My Soul.
- Throughout the movie, the characters reference several African-American historical figures, like Crispus Attucks, George Washington Carver, and Rosa Parks, highlighting the determination these figures took to fight for equality, just like Ernest.
