= Carol Ann Abrams =

American film producer (1942–2012)

- Born: Carol Ann Kelvin; September 23, 1942; New York City, U.S.
- Died: June 3, 2012 (aged 69); Los Angeles, California, U.S.
- Education: Penn State University, Whittier Law School
- Occupations: Television and film producer
- Spouse: Gerald W. Abrams (m. 1964)
- Children: 2, including J. J.
- Relatives: Gracie Abrams (granddaughter)
- Awards: Peabody Award

Carol Ann Abrams (née Kelvin; September 23, 1942 – June 3, 2012) was an American television and film producer. She and her husband, television producer Gerald W. Abrams, are the parents of film director and producer J. J. Abrams and screenwriter Tracy (née Abrams) Rosen. Abrams died from cancer.

== Early life ==
Born Carol Ann Kelvin in New York City to Lee (1915–2008) and Harry Kelvin (1911–1986), she earned a bachelor's degree with honors from Penn State University. After marrying Gerald Abrams and having two children, Abrams obtained a real estate license, specializing in properties in West Los Angeles and nearby Bel Air. She entered Whittier Law School when she was 39 years old and graduated valedictorian of her class. Her professors included lawyer-turned-celebrity journalist and TMZ founder, Harvey Levin. She worked as a professor at Whittier College for five years before entering the entertainment industry.

== Career ==
She developed and executive produced The Ernest Green Story, a 1993 television film which aired on the Disney Channel. The film following the true story of Ernest Green, played in the film by actor Morris Chestnut, one of the Little Rock Nine during the 1957 forced integration of Little Rock Central High School. The film premiered at Little Rock Central High School with an introduction by Bill Clinton, who was the President-Elect of the United States at the time. It aired on the Disney Channel in January 1993 and won a Peabody Award. She produced two television movies for CBS, Second Honeymoon in 2001, and Two Against Time in 2002. She later began a writing career, authoring two books, Grandparents & Grandchildren and Teen Knitting Club.
