= Elizabeth Huckaby =

American educator

Elizabeth Paisley Huckaby (14 April 1905 in Hamburg, Arkansas – 18 March 1999 in Little Rock, Arkansas) was an educator.

As the Vice-Principal for Girls of Little Rock Central High School, Huckaby was given the responsibility for protecting the six female members of the first nine black students admitted to the school after desegregation. Her book Crisis at Central High: Little Rock 1957–58, published in 1980, was based on a diary she kept on the events.

The daughter of a Presbyterian minister, Huckaby earned a B.A. and M.A. in education from the University of Arkansas, where she was elected to Phi Beta Kappa as an undergraduate. Her husband, Glenn Huckaby, was a long-time educator with the Little Rock School District.

She was portrayed by Joanne Woodward in the 1981 TV film based on Crisis at Central High.

- Encyclopedia of Arkansas History & Culture page on Elizabeth Huckaby
