= Crisis at Central High =

1981 television film directed by Lamont Johnson

- Genre: Drama; History
- Written by: Elizabeth Huckaby (memoir); Richard Levinson; William Link
- Directed by: Lamont Johnson
- Starring: Joanne Woodward; Charles Durning; Henderson Forsythe; Calvin Levels; William Russ; Tamu Blackwell; Shannon John; Bonnie Pemberton
- Music by: Billy Goldenberg
- Country of origin: United States
- Original language: English

Production
- Executive producers: Richard Levinson; William Link; David Susskind
- Producer: Robert Papazian
- Production locations: Dallas; Central High School - 1500 Park Street, Little Rock, Arkansas
- Cinematography: Donald M. Morgan
- Editor: John Wright
- Running time: 125 minutes
- Production company: Time Life Television

Original release
- Network: CBS
- Release: February 4, 1981

Crisis at Central High is a 1981 made-for-television movie about the Little Rock Integration Crisis of 1957, based on a draft of the memoir by the same name by former assistant principal Elizabeth Huckaby.

William Link and Richard Levinson wrote the screenplay and were executive producers together with David Susskind of Time-Life Productions. The film starred Joanne Woodward as Huckaby and told the events from that character's point of view, although one obituary at the time of Huckaby's death cited her as saying the TV-movie enlarged her role. Woodward was nominated for an Emmy Award for Outstanding Lead Actress in a Limited Series or a Special and a Golden Globe Award for Best Performance by an Actress in a Mini-Series or Motion Picture Made for TV, in 1981 and 1982 respectively.

== Composite characters ==
Like many docudramas, Crisis included some composite characters; at least one reviewer (O'Connor) criticizes the vague disclaimer to that effect, arguing that in a piece about such controversial events, alterations to the truth should be identified more specifically. In addition to the creative license already mentioned with regard to her role in the crisis, Huckaby was reported to have said the film showed some events are out of sequence and slightly altered others.

== Filming ==
The movie was filmed on location in Little Rock and at Woodrow Wilson High School in Dallas, Texas. Many local Dallas actors had featured roles in the film, including radio personality Suzie Humphreys, TV and theater actor Jerry Haynes, teacher and actress Irma P. Hall, and Theater Three director Norma Young, as well as Taylor, a native Dallasite who was attending Southern Methodist University at the time the film was being cast.

== Critical reception ==
Reviewer John O'Connor of The New York Times observed, "In the end, of course, the real heroes of this piece are the nine black students," whom O'Connor described as "played to quiet perfection." Actors highlighted for their portrayals included Calvin Levels as Ernest Green (the only senior in the group) and Regina Taylor as Minnijean Brown, launching that actress' professional career. Other principal actors in the film included Charles Durning as the principal and Henderson Forsythe as Huckaby's husband, Glenn.

== See also ==
- Civil rights movement in popular culture
- The Ernest Green Story
