= Greenwood Cemetery (Waco) =

Cemetery in Waco, Texas, United States

- Interactive map of Greenwood Cemetery

Details
- Established: 1875 or earlier
- Location: 500 S. Price Street; Waco, Texas, U.S.
- Country: United States
- Coordinates: 31°34′19″N 97°06′42″W
- No. of interments: over 7,000
- Find a Grave: Greenwood Cemetery

Greenwood Cemetery is a cemetery in Waco, Texas, United States. It was racially segregated for its entire history as a burial place, starting with its origins in the 1870s. It is one of the two oldest cemeteries in Waco along with Oakwood Cemetery. Because of the poverty of many people buried there, some of the graves were marked with wood or random objects rather than stone, or are unmarked. It contains a mass grave of 1918 influenza epidemic victims.

== Segregation ==
Black burials in the cemetery are in a separate area from white burials. A quarter-mile-long fence once bisected the cemetery, separating the two areas. The City of Waco removed the fence in June 2016, though by then the cemetery was no longer used for burials because of its unclear land ownership and many unmarked graves.

== Transfer to city and restoration ==
For much of Greenwood's history, two separate volunteer organizations maintained the two sides of the cemetery. Until 2017 the People's Cemetery Association cared for the Black side of the cemetery, and until 2014 the East Waco Greenwood Cemetery Association cared for the white side. Because of a lack of funding and membership, both organizations voted to turn the ownership of the cemetery over to the city of Waco in 2014.

Journalist Bill Minutaglio has written that the fence "served as a powerful, enduring symbol of racism" in Waco.

In 2020, a volunteer group began the mapping of the cemetery, recording the over 2,000 extant headstones.

== Notable burials ==
- Vivienne Malone-Mayes (1932–1995), mathematician and professor
- Andy Cooper (1898–1941), baseball player known as "Lefty"
- Jules Bledsoe (1898–1943), singer and composer
- Robert Lloyd Smith (1861–1942), politician and activist
