= Ruth Waldburger =

Swiss film producer (born 1951)

Ruth Waldburger (born 25 April 1951) is a Swiss film producer.

== Career ==
Ruth Waldburger was born on 25 April 1951 in Herisau, Switzerland. She was also raised in Arosa.

Waldburger started her career in 1974 working as a secretary for SRF, eventually becoming a production assistant on the TV show Kassensturz.

In 1991, Waldburger produced Johnny Suede, one of the first films starring Brad Pitt in a leading role. In almost 50 years in the film business, Waldburger's career spans over 100 movies, having worked with directors such as Jean-Luc Godard, Alain Resnais, Robert Frank, Gianni Amelio, Noémie Lvovsky, Léos Carax, and Silvio Soldini.

In 1988, Waldburger co-founded the Swiss production company Vega Film AG.

In 2023, Waldburger received an honorary Swiss Film Award for her contributions to Swiss cinema.

== Selected filmography ==
- 1991 Johnny Suede
- 1997 Same Old Song
- 1999 Notre musique
- 1999 Le vie ne me fait pas peur
- 2001 Roberto Succo
- 2004 The Chorus (Les Choristes)
- 2010 The Little Room
- 2010 Film Socialisme
- 2012 Sister (L'enfant d'en haut)
- 2020 My Little Sister (Schwesterlein)
- 2021 Tides
