= Regina Taylor =

American actress and playwright (born 1960)

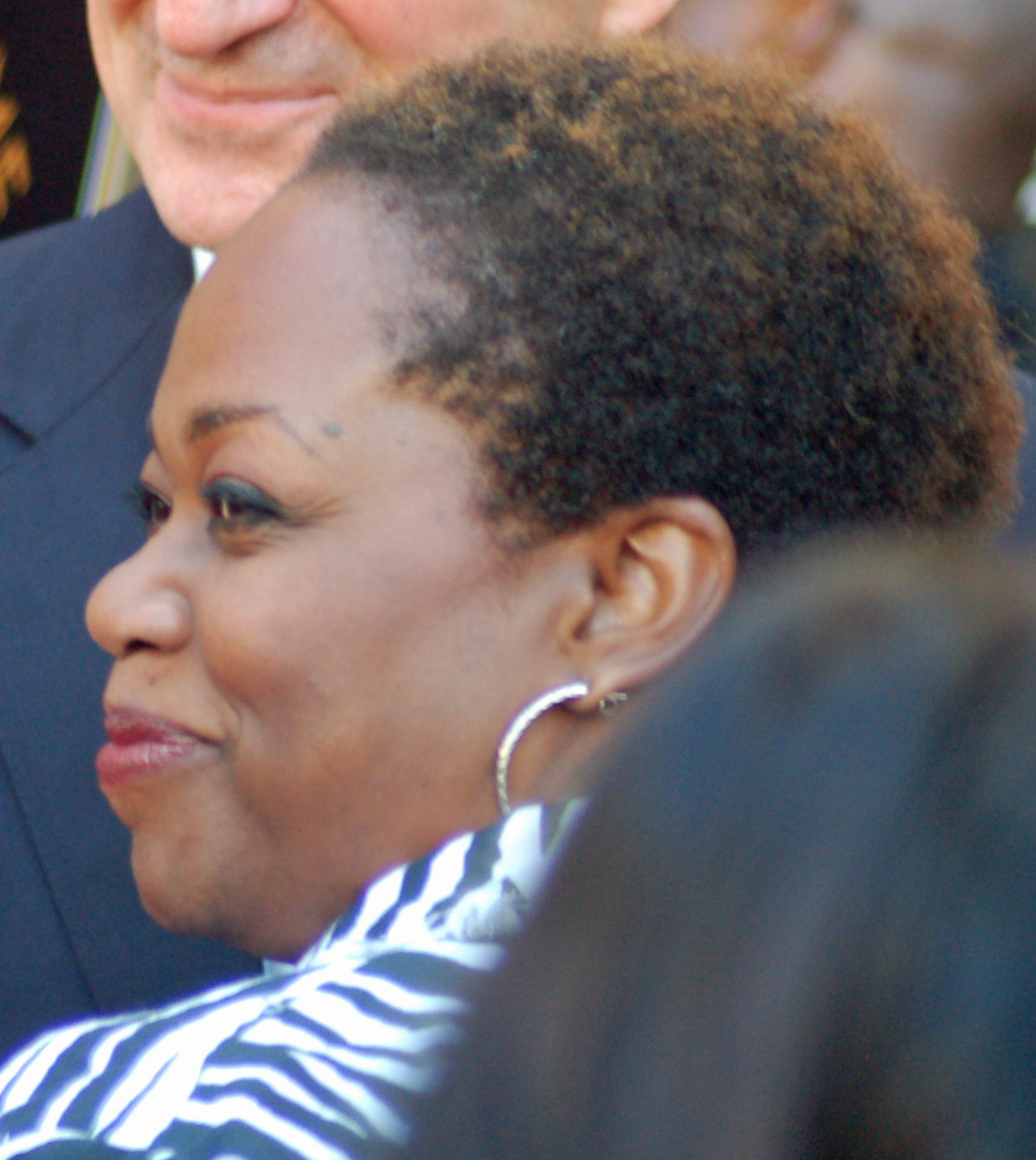
- Taylor in 2010
- Born: August 22, 1960 (age 66)
- Education: Southern Methodist University (BFA)
- Occupation: Actress
- Years active: 1980–present

Regina Taylor (born August 22, 1960) is an American actress and playwright. She has won several awards throughout her career, including a Golden Globe Award and NAACP Image Award. In July 2017, Taylor was announced as the new Denzel Washington Endowed Chair in Theater at Fordham University.

== Early life and education ==
At the age of 12, Taylor moved to Muskogee, Oklahoma. The family later returned to Dallas, where she graduated from L. G. Pinkston High School in 1977.

== Acting ==
Her earliest professional acting roles were two made-for-television films while she was studying at Southern Methodist University: 1980's Nurse (1980) and Crisis at Central High (1981). In the latter movie, she was praised by critic John O'Connor of The New York Times for her portrayal of Minnijean Brown, a member of the Little Rock Nine, a group of African-American students who braved violence and armed guards to integrate Little Rock Central High School in 1957.

Her first role to garner widespread attention was that of Mrs. Carter, the drug-addicted mother of a promising young female student, in the 1989 film Lean on Me. She became well known to the television viewing public for her role as Lilly Harper on the early 1990s TV series I'll Fly Away. This role won her a Golden Globe award for Best Actress in a Television Drama and also an NAACP Image Award for Outstanding Actress in a Drama Series. In 2018, Taylor had a role as Dr. Hannah Moshay in season 5 of the highly successful NBC crime thriller series The Blacklist.

Since then she has had various supporting roles in films, such as the Spike Lee film Clockers, Courage Under Fire, A Family Thing, The Negotiator, and for the films Losing Isaiah and Strange Justice — a Showtime original film in which she portrayed Anita Hill — and as the lead in the PBS telefilm Cora Unashamed, based on a Langston Hughes short story. She was a cast member for all four seasons of the CBS drama The Unit.

Taylor is also an accomplished stage actress, and was the first black woman to play Juliet in Romeo and Juliet on Broadway. Her other Broadway credits include Macbeth and As You Like It. She appeared in Off-Broadway and regional productions of such plays as Jar the Floor (Off-Broadway, 1999), Machinal (Off-Broadway, 1990), L'Illusion (Off-Broadway, 1988), and A Map of the World (Off-Broadway, Public Theatre). She appeared as "Ariel" in The Tempest at the La Jolla Playhouse, California in 1987, for which she received a Dramalogue Award.

In 2016, Taylor starred in the original pilot of Time After Time as Vanessa Anders, but was replaced by Nicole Ari Parker before the series aired, containing a new pilot with Parker.

== Playwriting ==
As of 2022, Taylor is currently the writer-in-residence at the Signature Theatre, where her play stop. reset. premiered at the off-Broadway Pershing Square Signature Center on September 8, 2013. Taylor also directed the production.

She wrote Escape from Paradise, a one-woman show which was produced at the Goodman Theatre Studio, Chicago, in October 1995. Her short plays Watermelon Rinds and Inside the Belly of the Beast were incorporated into a program at the Goodman Theatre Studio in 1994. She wrote and appeared in the play Millennium Mambo, a one-woman work, presented at the Goodman Theatre in February 2000. She wrote the play A Night in Tunisia, which premiered during the 2000 Alabama Shakespeare Festival.

In 2000, Taylor won a best new play award from the American Critics' Association for Oo-Bla-Dee, a play about 1940s female jazz musicians. The Goodman Theatre produced the play in 1999.

She wrote and directed Crowns, which is a co-production of the McCarter Theatre, where it premiered in October 2002 and the Second Stage Theatre, produced in December 2002. Crowns is described by Playbill as a "play-with-gospel-music", and is based on the book of the same name of photographs by Michael Cunningham and journalist Craig Marberry. Crowns has been produced in various locations, including the Meroney Theater in Salisbury, North Carolina with The Piedmont Players in May 2009; the Zach Theatre in Austin, Texas in September 2004, the Pasadena Playhouse in co-production with Ebony Repertory Theatre in July 2009; Syracuse Stage in Syracuse, New York; at the Connecticut Repertory Theatre in Storrs, Connecticut in May 2009 and at the Electric City Playhouse in Anderson, South Carolina in May 2011. Crowns was the most performed musical in the country in 2006. It won four Helen Hayes Awards (for Washington, D.C. productions), including Taylor's win for Best Direction as well as Best Regional Musical.

She wrote and directed an adaptation of Anton Chekhov's The Seagull titled Drowning Crow. Drowning Crow was produced on Broadway in February 2004 by the Manhattan Theatre Club at the Biltmore Theatre, directed by Marion McClinton.

She wrote and directed The Dreams of Sarah Breedlove, a dramatic rendering of the financial gains and emotional losses of African-American businesswoman Madam C.J. Walker, which received its world premiere production in January 2005 at the Alabama Shakespeare Festival.

Taylor's play Magnolia, set during the beginning of desegregation in Atlanta in 1963, premiered at Chicago's Goodman Theatre in March 2009 directed by Anna Shapiro. after receiving a workshop production in July 2008 at the National Playwrights' Conference at the Eugene O'Neill Theater Center in Waterford, Connecticut.

Taylor returned to the Goodman Theatre in January and February 2011 for the world premiere of her new play entitled The Trinity River Plays, a co-production with Dallas Theater Center, directed by Ethan McSweeny. The production is a trilogy composed of Jar Fly, Rain, and Ghoststory.

Taylor's 2017 play A Seat at the Table was commissioned by Carthage College's Theatre Department, the ninth play commissioned as part of their New Play Initiative. The play tells the story of the life of civil rights activist Fannie Lou Hamer. The production was invited to the 2018 region 3 Kennedy Center American College Theater Festival.

== Personal life ==
According to a DNA analysis, she is descended, mainly, from the Mende people of Sierra Leone and the Kru people of Liberia. Taylor is a member of Alpha Kappa Alpha sorority.

In 1982, she married artist Mario Emes.

== Filmography ==
Year	Title	Role	Notes
1980	Nurse	Unknown	
1981	Crisis at Central High	Minniejean Brown	Television movie
1984	American Playhouse	Burnetta	Episode: "Concealed Enemies, Part I: Suspicion"
1989	Lean on Me	Mrs. Carter	
1991	Law & Order	Evelyn Griggs	Episode: "Mushrooms"
1991–1993	I'll Fly Away	Lilly Harper	38 episodes Golden Globe Award for Best Actress – Television Series Drama; Image Award for Outstanding Lead Actress in a Drama Series; Viewers for Quality Television Award for Best Actress in a Quality Drama Series (1992–93); Nominated—Primetime Emmy Award for Outstanding Lead Actress in a Drama Series (1992–93)
1992	Jersey Girl	Rosie	
1993	I'll Fly Away: Then and Now	Lilly Harper	Television movie
1994	Law & Order	Sarah Maslin	Episode: "Virtue"
1995	Children of the Dust	Drusilla	Television movie Nominated—Image Award for Outstanding Lead Actress in a Miniseries or a Movie
1995	Losing Isaiah	Gussie	
1995	Clockers	Iris Jeeter	Nominated—Image Award for Outstanding Supporting Actress in a Motion Picture
1995	The Keeper	Angela Lamont	
1996	A Family Thing	Ann	
1996	Courage Under Fire	Meredith Serling	Nominated—Image Award for Outstanding Supporting Actress in a Motion Picture
1997	Spirit Lost	Willy	
1997	Hostile Waters	Lieutenant Curtis	Television movie
1997	The Third Twin	Sergeant Michelle Delaware	Television movie
1998	The Negotiator	Karen Roman	
1999	Strange Justice	Anita Hill	Television movie Nominated—Satellite Award for Best Actress – Miniseries or Television Film
2000	Cora Unashamed	Cora Jenkins	Television movie
2001–2002	The Education of Max Bickford	Judith Bryant	22 episodes
2006–2009	The Unit	Molly Blane	69 episodes Image Award for Outstanding Lead Actress in a Drama Series; Nominated—Image Award for Outstanding Lead Actress in a Drama Series
2006	In From the Night	Dr. A. Gardner	Television movie
2008	Grey's Anatomy	Greta	Episode: "Losing My Mind"
2010	Who Is Clark Rockefeller?	Megan Norton	Television movie
2015	Dig	Ruth Lidell	TV series
2016	Time After Time	Vanessa Anders	Unaired pilot
2016	Elementary	Dr. Wilkerson	S05-E15
2017	Saturday Church	Aunt Rose	
2018	The Blacklist	Dr. Hannah Moshay	Episode: Pattie Sue Edwards
2020	Lovecraft Country	Hattie	
2020	All Day & A Night	Tommetta	
2022	The First Lady	Marian Shields Robinson	
2022	Blue Bloods	NYPD Captain Terrell	Episode: "On the Arm"
2023	East New York	Councilwoman	Episode: "There Goes The Neighborhood"
2023	CSI: Vegas	Raquel Williams	Episode: "The Promise"
2024	Dreams in Nightmares	Bernice	
