= Minnijean Brown-Trickey =

American activist (born 1941)

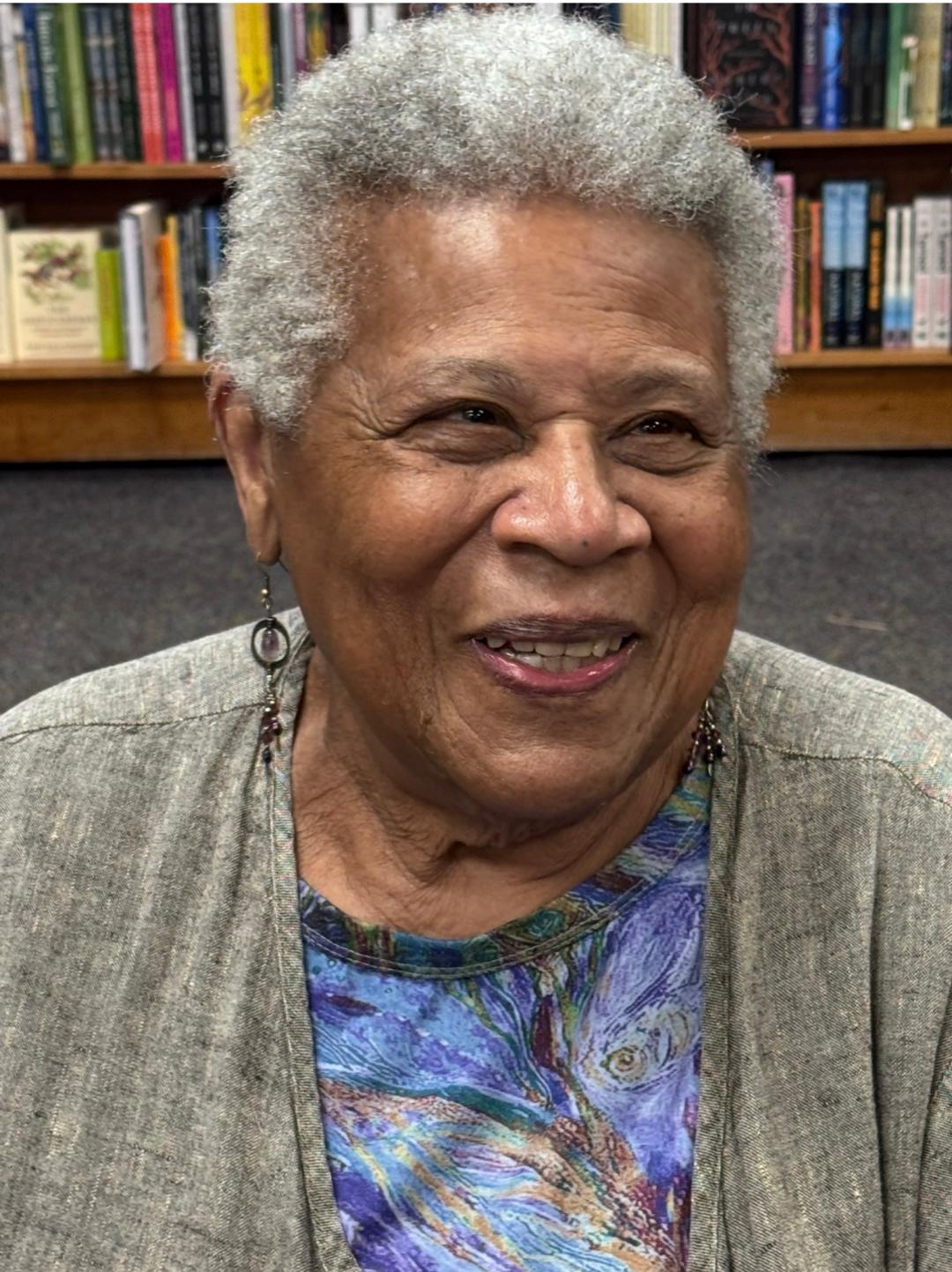
- Brown-Trickey at the Politics and Prose Bookstore in Washington, D.C. (2026)

Deputy Assistant Secretary of the Department of the Interior For Workforce Diversity
- In office 1999–2001
- President: Bill Clinton

Personal details
- Born: September 11, 1941 (age 85) Rogers, Arkansas, U.S.
- Education: Laurentian University
- Occupation: Civil rights activist
- Awards include the Congressional Gold Medal and Spingarn Medal

Minnijean Brown-Trickey (born September 11, 1941) is an American political figure who was a member of the Little Rock Nine, a group of nine African American teenagers who integrated Little Rock Central High School. The integration followed the Brown v. Board of Education decision which required public schools to be desegregated.

== Early life ==
Minnijean Brown was born to Willie and Imogene Brown in Little Rock, Arkansas. Willie worked as an independent mason and a landscaping contractor while Imogene was a homemaker and a nurses aide. Minnijean was the eldest of four siblings. She began her high school career in 1956 at Horace Mann, an all-black school located in Little Rock, AR. She later transferred to Little Rock Central High School in 1957 following the Brown v. Board of Education decision. She was expelled from Central and finished her high school education in New York at the New Lincoln School in Manhattan.

== Little Rock Nine ==
In September 1957, with the help of Daisy Bates, a prominent civil rights activist in Central Arkansas, Minnijean Brown set out to integrate Little Rock Central High School alongside eight other African American students. The students originally attempted to enter the school on September 4, 1957, but were stopped by the Arkansas National Guard called in by Governor Orval Faubus. In response, President Dwight D. Eisenhower sent 1,200 U.S. paratroopers from the 101st Airborne Division to assist the Little Rock Nine in entering the school. On September 25, 1957, Brown along with the other eight students desegregated Little Rock Central High School.

Despite the troops being stationed at the high school throughout the '57-'58 school year, the nine students were physically and verbally harassed by their classmates. Brown was the first suspended out of the Little Rock Nine and she was the only one to be expelled. Her suspension was the result of an incident which took place on December 17, 1957. While walking through the crowded cafeteria during lunch, Brown-Trickey was harassed and ended up dropping her lunch tray and spilling chili on two male students. She was suspended from school for six days. Following her suspension, Minnijean came back to school and a white student spilled soup on her. He was only suspended for two days. Later, in February, a group of girls threw a purse filled with combination locks at Minnijean. She responded by calling the girls "white trash" and was immediately expelled. After her expulsion, students at Central passed a note around which stated, "One down, eight to go."

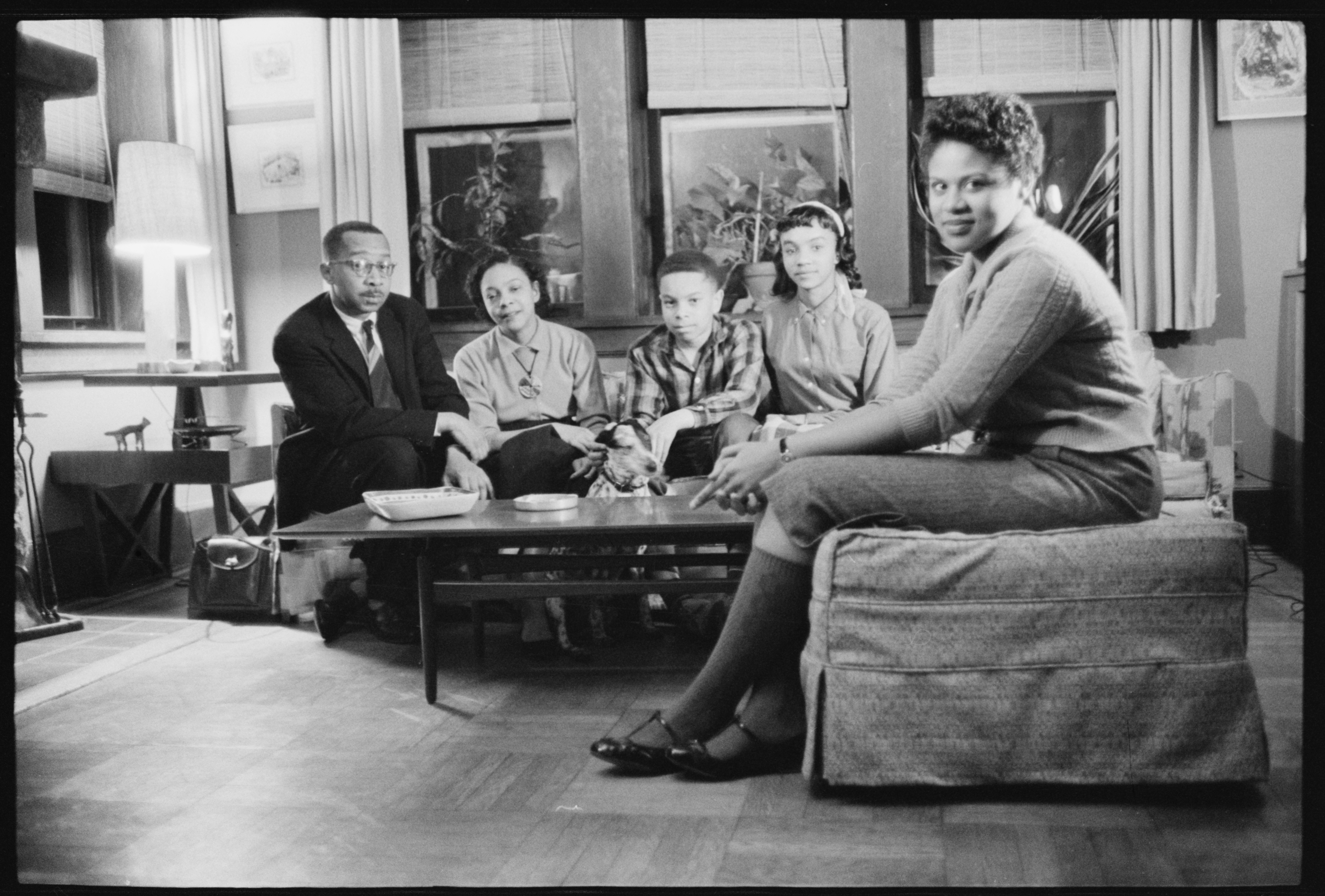
Brown at the home of Kenneth and Mamie Clark, 1958

Following the incident, Brown moved to New York and lived with Drs. Kenneth B. and Mamie Clark. The Clarks were African American psychologists who helped with the argument presented by the National Association for the Advancement of Colored People (NAACP) in the Brown v. Board of Education case.

Brown attended the New Lincoln School in Manhattan for 11th and 12th grade.

== Later life ==
Brown attended Southern Illinois University where she majored in journalism. In 1967, Brown married Roy Trickey. The couple had six children before divorcing in the 1980s. One of her daughters, Spirit Trickey, worked for the Little Rock Central High School National Historic Site in Little Rock for 10 years. She lived in Canada for a number of years in the 1980s and 1990s, where she studied social work at Laurentian University in Sudbury, Ontario, and later completing a Master of Social Work degree at Carleton University in Ottawa, Ontario. She moved back to America and worked for the Clinton Administration in 1999 through 2001 as the Deputy Assistant Secretary for Workforce Diversity at the Department of the Interior.

She became a public speaker, and has spoken in 49 states as well as several countries including Canada, England, and South Africa. The speaking event that Brown-Trickey values the most was speaking at an award ceremony for Malala Yousafzai.

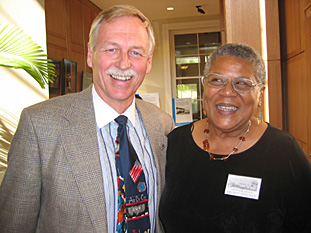
Brown-Trickey with Congressman Vic Snyder.

Brown-Trickey has been the recipient of many awards including a Lifetime Achievement Tribute by the Canadian Race Relations Foundation, the International Wolf Award, the Spingarn Medal, and an award from the W.E.B. DuBois Institute. Under the Clinton administration, Brown-Trickey received the Congressional Gold Medal in 1999 alongside the other members of the Little Rock Nine.

== Media portrayals ==
Brown-Trickey has been depicted in two made-for-television movies about the Little Rock Nine. She was portrayed by Regina Taylor in the 1981 CBS movie Crisis at Central High, and by Monica Calhoun in the 1993 Disney Channel movie The Ernest Green Story. A documentary film about Brown-Trickey entitled Journey to Little Rock: The Untold Story of Minnijean Brown Trickey (2002) was produced by North-East Pictures in Ottawa, where Brown-Trickey lived during the 1990s.
