= Calvin Levels =

American film actor (born 1954)

- Born: September 30, 1954 (age 71); Cleveland, Ohio, United States
- Occupation: Actor
- Years active: 1978–2003

Calvin Levels (born September 30, 1954) is an American film actor. In 1984, he won a Theatre World Award and was nominated for both the Tony Award for Best Performance by a Leading Actor in a Play and the Drama Desk Award for Outstanding Featured Actor in a Play for his portrayal of Calvin Jefferson in Open Admissions. Levels is known for his roles in the films The Atlanta Child Murders (1985), Adventures in Babysitting (1987), Johnny Suede (1991), and Hellbound (1994). For his role in The Atlanta Child Murders, Levels had to drastically change his diet and quit exercising, which he said took months to undo.

== Filmography ==
=== Film ===
Year	Film	Role	Other notes
1981	Ragtime	Gang Member No. 3	
1987	Adventures in Babysitting	Joe Gipp	
1988	The Chair	Wilma	
1991	Johnny Suede	Deke	
1991	Convicts	Leroy	
1992	In the Heat of the Night	Laurence	
1993	Point of No Return	Computer Instructor	
1994	Hellbound	Detective Calvin Jackson	
1996	Follow Me Home	Kaz	
1996	8 Heads in a Duffel Bag	Head of Jamal	
1997	Skyscraper	Hakim	
2003	Black Listed	Trouble Truman	

=== Television ===
Year	Show	Role	Notes
1979	Charleston	Jeff	Television film
1980	A Christmas Without Snow	Wendell	Television film
1981	Crisis at Central High	Ernest Green	Television film
1985	The Atlanta Child Murders	Wayne Williams	Miniseries
1989	21 Jump Street	Roy Hodges	Episode: "Next Victim"
1990	Monsters	Luchinski	Episode: "Far Below"
1991	Roc	Junebug	Episode: "Roc Works for Joey"
1991	Midnight Caller	Ray Atkins	Episode: "A Cry in the Night"
1992	Live! From Death Row	Kenny Nevins	Television film
1995	The Watcher	Wiley Nemo	Episode: "Fathers and Sons"
1995	Space: Above and Beyond	First Mate Potter	Episode: "Mutiny"
1996	Within the Rock	Banton	Television film
