= The Atlanta Child Murders (miniseries) =

1985 film

- Written by: Abby Mann
- Directed by: John Erman
- Starring: Calvin Levels; Morgan Freeman; James Earl Jones; Rip Torn; Jason Robards; Lynne Moody; Ruby Dee; Gloria Foster; Paul Benjamin; Martin Sheen; Andrew Robinson; Bill Paxton
- Music by: Billy Goldenberg
- Country of origin: United States
- Original language: English

Production
- Producers: Bill Finnegan; Abby Mann; Sheldon Pinchuk; Carl Pingitore; Gerald Rafshoon
- Running time: 245 minutes

Original release
- Network: CBS
- Release: February 10 – February 12, 1985

The Atlanta Child Murders is an American television miniseries that aired on February 10 and 12, 1985 on CBS. The miniseries is a dramatization of the "Atlanta child murders" in which 29 African American children were murdered in Atlanta from summer 1979 through spring 1981. It is mostly historically accurate, but like the case that it is based on has been the subject of controversy. City officials, who had opted not to participate in the production, expressed disappointment at it. The entire second half of the movie takes place in the court room. The trial took place in January and February 1982.

== Cast ==
- Calvin Levels as Wayne Williams
- Morgan Freeman as Ben Shelter, police detective (also narrator)
- James Earl Jones as Major Walker, chief of police
- Rip Torn as Lewis Slaton, prosecutor
- Jason Robards as Alvin Binder, defense attorney
- Lynne Moody as Selena Cobb
- Ruby Dee as Faye Williams
- Gloria Foster as Camille Bell
- Paul Benjamin as Homer Williams
- Martin Sheen as Chet Dettlinger, retired police officer and private investigator
- Andrew Robinson as Jack Mallard
- Bill Paxton as Campbell, law enforcement deputy

== Plot summary ==
Between the summer of 1979 and the spring of 1981, 29 African American children, adolescents and adults were murdered in Atlanta, Georgia. The killings gained nationwide attention, with many suspecting that they were the work of the Ku Klux Klan or a similar white supremacist group. However, in June 1981, a 23-year-old African American named Wayne Williams was arrested for first-degree murder in the deaths of 27-year-old Nathaniel Carter and 29-year-old Jimmy Ray Payne. Eight months later, Williams was convicted of both killings and sentenced to two consecutive terms of life imprisonment. Some parties speculate that Williams was not the real killer, and that local law enforcement officials used him as a scapegoat to bring a seemingly unsolvable case to a close. However, it is generally presumed that Williams was the culprit in most of the murders, if not all of them. No one was ever tried in connection with the other killings.

== Reception ==
- Atlanta officials criticized The Atlanta Child Murders, claiming that it distorted the facts of the case. After a series of negotiations, CBS executives agreed to insert a disclaimer alerting viewers that the film is “not a documentary, but a drama based on certain facts surrounding the murder and disappearance of children in Atlanta” and includes fictionalized events and characters.
- In a February 10, 1985 review of The Atlanta Child Murders, The New York Times questioned whether the program should have been made at all, calling it "an irresponsible piece of work."
- In 2000, Showtime aired a similarly-themed movie entitled Echo of Murder, starring James Belushi and Gregory Hines. When released on DVD, it was retitled Who Killed Atlanta's Children?
