= Lee Lorch =

American mathematician

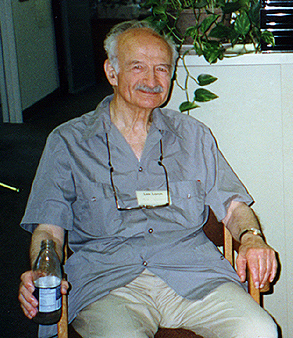
Lee Lorch, 1995

Lee Alexander Lorch (September 20, 1915 – February 28, 2014) was an American mathematician, and early civil rights activist. His leadership in the campaign to desegregate Stuyvesant Town, a large housing development on the East Side of Manhattan, helped eventually to make housing discrimination illegal in the United States but also resulted in Lorch losing his own job twice. He and his family then moved to the Southern United States where he and his wife, Grace Lorch, became involved in the civil rights movement there while also teaching at several Black colleges. He encouraged black students to pursue studies in mathematics and mentored several of the first black men and women to earn PhDs in mathematics in the United States. After moving to Canada as a result of McCarthyism, he ended his career as professor emeritus of mathematics at York University in Toronto, Ontario.

== Background ==
He was born in New York City to Adolph Lorch and Florence Mayer Lorch. He graduated from Cornell University in 1935 and obtained his PhD in mathematics from the University of Cincinnati in 1941.

He did mathematics-related work for the war effort in a "draft exempt" job but quit in 1943 to enlist in the United States Army. He saw service in India and the Pacific Theater of World War II before being demobilized in 1946. Lorch obtained a teaching position at the City College of New York following the war but was soon fired because of his civil rights work on behalf of African Americans.

== Stuyvesant Town ==
"I had become very aware of racism through the war; not just anti-Semitism, but the way the American army treated black soldiers. On the troop transport overseas, it was always the black company on board that had to clean the ship and do the dirty work, and I felt very uncomfortable with that," Lorch told an interviewer in 2007.

Some time after taking up his job at City College, he moved into Stuyvesant Town, a development owned by the Metropolitan Life Insurance Company built with financial and legal support from New York City for war veterans. Outraged at the development's "No Negroes" policy, Lorch became a vice-chair of a tenants' committee formed to eliminate this discrimination. This had two-thirds support from the other tenants. City College, though conceding the excellence of his work, dismissed Lorch, refusing to give any reason. Lorch obtained a new position at Pennsylvania State University, but rather than give up his apartment he asked a black friend and his family to move into his dwelling as "guests", a move which circumvented the policy against accepting housing applications from blacks, but which also resulted in his being fired from Penn State, as reported in The New York Times on April 10, 1950. An editorial in the Times the following day (April 11) called on Penn State to reconsider, recalling the suspicious nature of his dismissal from City College the previous year, to no avail.

"It's hard to imagine now, but there was no civil rights legislation back then. You could be fired without explanation. But how could you do anything else, in all good conscience?" said Lorch in 2007.

== Moving South ==
After being fired by Penn State, Lorch obtained a teaching position at Fisk University, a black college located in Tennessee, in 1950.

In 1951 there was a south-eastern sectional meeting of the Mathematical Association of America in Nashville. The citation delivered at the 2007 MAA awards presentation, where Lorch received a standing ovation, recorded that:

Lee Lorch, the chair of the mathematics department at Fisk University, and three Black colleagues, Evelyn Boyd (now Granville), Walter Brown, and H. M. Holloway came to the meeting and were able to attend the scientific sessions. However, the organizer for the closing banquet refused to honor the reservations of these four mathematicians. (Letters in Science, August 10, 1951, pp. 161–162 spell out the details). Lorch and his colleagues wrote to the governing bodies of the AMS and MAA seeking bylaws against discrimination. Bylaws were not changed, but non-discriminatory policies were established and have been strictly observed since then.

== House Un-American Activities Committee ==
In 1955, Lorch was called before the House Un-American Activities Committee after he and his wife, Grace, attempted to enroll their daughter, Alice, in an all-black elementary school after the United States Supreme Court ruled in Brown v. Board of Education that school segregation was unconstitutional. The Committee's questioning immediately went in a political direction: though Lorch "pointedly denied" engaging in any Communist activity during his tenure at Fisk, he refused to answer questions about his party membership prior to 1941, citing the right to do so under the First Amendment to the United States Constitution, and never made use of the Fifth Amendment. His refusal to testify before HUAC resulted in his being indicted, tried and acquitted for contempt of Congress–nevertheless, during the House of Un-American Activities Committee hearing Fisk University's president, Charles S. Johnson, issued a statement that Lorch's position before the HUAC was "for all practical purposes tantamount to admission of membership in the Communist Party." Despite the appeals on Lorch's behalf from 48 out of 70 staff members, 22 student body leaders, and 150 alumni, Fisk ended his contract.

== Little Rock Nine ==
In 1957, Lorch was working as chair of the Mathematics Department at Philander Smith College, a small black college in Little Rock, Arkansas. That year, he and his wife, Grace, helped escort the Little Rock Nine, nine high school students attempting to be the first black students to enroll at Little Rock Central High School against white segregationist opposition that was so ferocious his wife helped protect a 15-year-old black girl, Elizabeth Eckford, from a mob. Faced with threats and sticks of dynamite left in their garage and with the school's funding at risk, Lorch resigned and was again forced to look for new employment.

== Move to Canada ==
In 1959, facing a blacklist by most US universities, Lorch accepted a position with the University of Alberta and moved his family to Canada. He moved to York University in Toronto in 1968 and taught there until his retirement in 1985. He maintained an office at York and, in 2007, was collaborating with Martin Muldoon on a paper about Bessel functions.

Lorch remained a political activist in Canada and was a member of the Communist Party of Canada, the United Jewish Peoples Order and honorary president of the Canadian Cuban Friendship Association.

== Academic work and recognition ==
Lorch's dissertation, under Otto Szász, focused on the behavior of certain classes of Fourier series and his subsequent research also focused on analysis.

He has been recognized for his academic work with a fellowship in the Royal Society of Canada, election to the councils of the Canadian Mathematical Society, the American Mathematical Society and the Royal Society of Canada.

Two of the colleges that fired him, Fisk and City University, have awarded Lorch with honorary degrees. He was also honored by the U.S. National Academy of Sciences in 1990 and by Spelman College in 1999. In 2003, the International Society for Analysis, its Applications and Computation presented him with an honorary life membership for distinguished mathematical contributions and for his struggles for the disadvantaged and world peace.

In 2007, Lorch was awarded with the Mathematical Association of America's most prestigious award, the Yueh-Gin Gung and Dr. Charles Y. Hu Award for Distinguished Service to Mathematics, and in 2007 he was the first Canadian, and one of only 17 non-Cubans, to be elected to the Cuban Academy of Sciences. In 2012 he became a fellow of the American Mathematical Society. He served on the AMS Council as a member-at-large 1974-1976 and 1980-1982.

== Legacy ==
Lorch's legacy as a teacher at black universities such as Fisk and Philander Smith was to encourage black students, including black women, to pursue graduate study in mathematics. At Fisk, Lorch taught three of the first black students ever to earn doctorates in mathematics. Of the 21 American black women who obtained a PhD in mathematics before 1980, Lorch taught three during his tenure at Fisk University.

In 2010, Lorch was asked if he would have done anything any differently. "More and better of the same," he replied. He died in 2014 in Toronto, aged 98.

== See also ==
- Grace Lorch
- List of peace activists
