= Hazel Massery =

American anti-integration activist

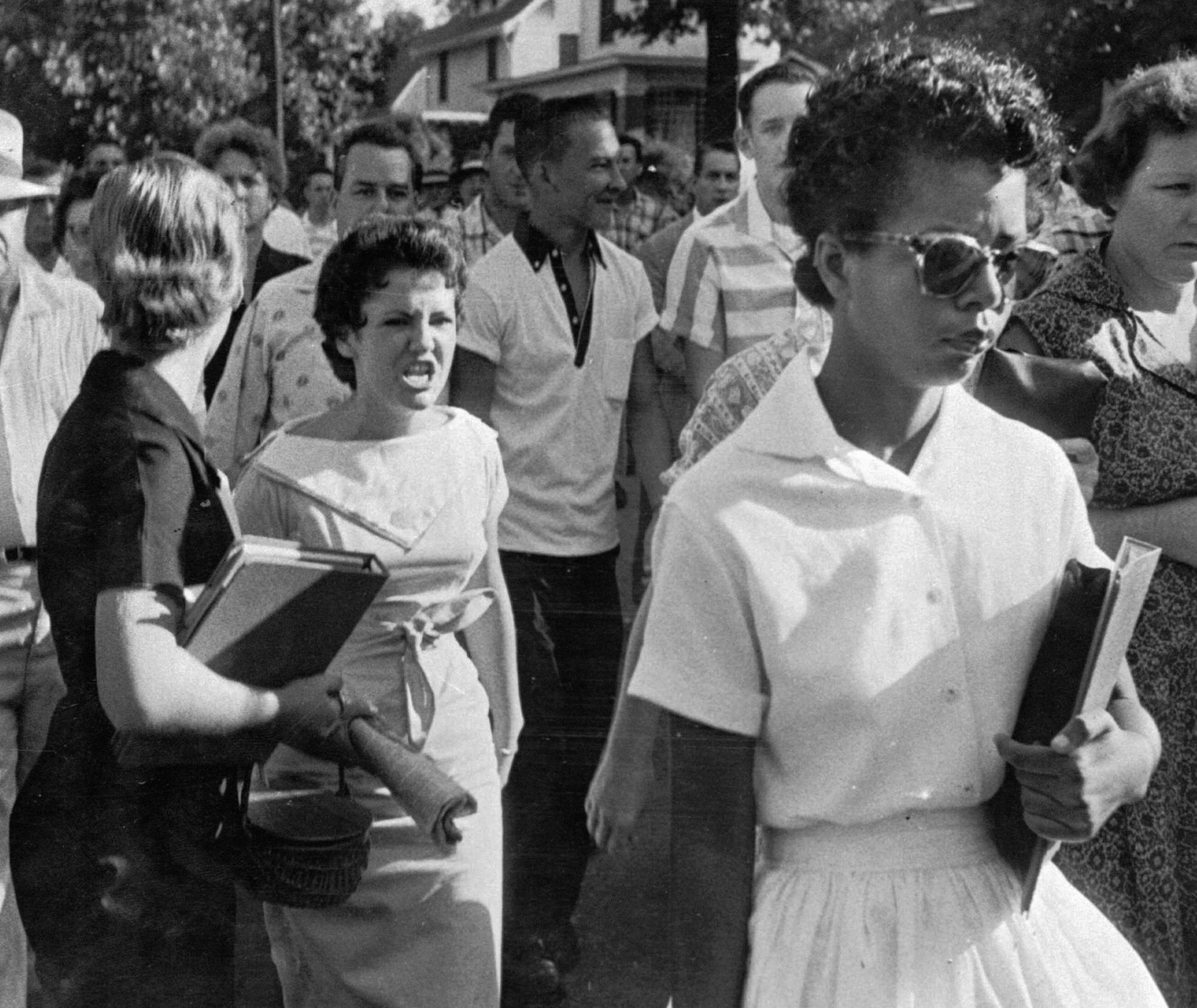
- Massery, age 15, shouting at Eckford, age 15, in 1957
- Born: Hazel Bryan; January 31, 1942 (age 84)
- Spouse: Antoine Massery

Hazel Bryan Massery (born January 31, 1942) is an American woman who is known for bullying a black student at her school integration. She was depicted in an iconic photograph taken by photojournalist Will Counts in 1957 showing her shouting angrily at Elizabeth Eckford, one of the Little Rock Nine, during the Little Rock Crisis.In 1963, having changed her mind on integration and feeling guilt for her treatment of Eckford, Massery contacted Eckford to apologize.

== Little Rock High School ==
On September 9, 1957, nine African-American students entered Little Rock Central High School as the school's first black students, including Elizabeth Eckford. On her way to the school, a group of white teenage girls followed Eckford, chanting "Two, four, six, eight! We don't want to integrate!" One of these girls was Massery. Benjamin Fine of The New York Times later described her as "screaming, just hysterical, just like one of these Elvis Presley hysterical deals, where these kids are fainting with hysteria." Massery also shouted, "Go home, nigger! Go back to Africa!"

After the photo became public, Massery started to receive "critical" mail, mostly from the North. Author David Margolick wrote that while Massery only found the criticism "surprising", her parents found her sudden notoriety sufficiently alarming to pull her out of the school."

Massery left her new school when she was 17, married Antoine Massery and began a family. After that, her attitude toward Martin Luther King Jr. and the concept of desegregation changed. "Hazel Bryan Massery was curious, and reflective... One day, she realized, her children would learn that the snarling little brat in their history books was their mother. She realized she had an account to settle."

In 1963, having changed her mind on integration and feeling guilt for her treatment of Eckford, Massery contacted Eckford to apologize. They went their separate ways after this first meeting, and Eckford did not name the girl in the picture when asked about it by reporters.

During the time after Little Rock, Massery had become increasingly political, branching out into peace activism and social work. David Margolick discovered, "She taught mothering skills to unmarried black women, and took underprivileged black teenagers on field trips. She frequented the black history section at the local Barnes & Noble, buying books by Cornel West and Shelby Steele and the companion volume to Eyes on the Prize."

Massery hoped her reputation could be gained back, but this did not happen until the 40th anniversary of Central's desegregation in 1997. Will Counts, the journalist who took the famous picture, arranged for Eckford and Massery to meet again. The reunion provided an opportunity for acts of reconciliation, as noted in this editorial from the Arkansas Democrat-Gazette on the first day of 1998:

One of the fascinating stories to come out of the reunion was the apology that Hazel Bryan Massery made to Elizabeth Eckford for a terrible moment caught forever by the camera. That 40-year-old picture of hate assailing grace — which had gnawed at Ms. Massery for decades — can now be wiped clean, and replaced by a snapshot of two friends. The apology came from the real Hazel Bryan Massery, the decent woman who had been hidden all those years by a fleeting image. And the graceful acceptance of that apology was but another act of dignity in the life of Elizabeth Eckford.

== Communication with Elizabeth Eckford ==
Despite feeling awkward when they met again in 1997, Eckford and Massery briefly became friends. In 1999, David Margolick travelled to Little Rock and arranged to meet Eckford and Massery. According to Massery, she said, "I think she still… at times we have a little… well, the honeymoon is over and now we're getting to take out the garbage." Eckford began to believe Massery "wanted me to be cured and be over it and for this not to go on... She wanted me to be less uncomfortable so that she wouldn't feel responsible anymore."

By the year 2000, the two were no longer in regular contact. When asked for permission to reprint a poster titled "Reconciliation" showing Eckford and Massery shaking hands, Eckford granted it with a requirement that a small sticker be included stating, "True reconciliation can occur only when we honestly acknowledge our painful, but shared, past."
