= Johnny Suede =

1991 American film by Tom DiCillo

- Theatrical poster
- Directed by: Tom DiCillo
- Written by: Tom DiCillo
- Produced by: Yoram Mandel; Ruth Waldburger
- Starring: Brad Pitt; Catherine Keener; Calvin Levels; Alison Moir; Nick Cave; Tina Louise
- Cinematography: Joe DeSalvo
- Edited by: Geraldine Peroni
- Music by: Jim Farmer
- Distributed by: Miramax Films
- Release date: August 1991; (Locarno Film Festival)
- Running time: 97 minutes
- Country: United States
- Language: English
- Budget: $500,000
- Box office: $90,000

Johnny Suede is a 1991 American film, the directorial debut of Tom DiCillo, and stars Brad Pitt and Catherine Keener in some of their earliest roles, along with Calvin Levels and Nick Cave.

== Synopsis ==
Johnny Suede is a young man with an attitude and an immense pompadour, who aspires to be a rock n' roll star like his idol Ricky Nelson. He believes he has all the stylistic accoutrements sans a pair of black suede shoes. One night, a pair of black suede shoes mysteriously appear, landing on top of the telephone booth he was using.

Shortly thereafter, Johnny meets Darlette, a sultry bohemian with whom he sleeps. Despite Darlette's jealous and abusive gun-toting boyfriend, Johnny sees Darlette daily. The destitute Johnny is forced to pawn his guitar to pay his rent while Darlette mysteriously vanishes. Johnny's friend Deke lends him the money to get his guitar back from the pawnshop, and the duo forms a band. Sad and depressed about Darlette's desertion, Johnny wanders around New York aimlessly until he meets Yvonne, a woman more intelligent than Johnny. Yvonne teaches him that there are things in life more important than a pair of black suede shoes.

== Cast ==
- Brad Pitt as Johnny Suede
- Michael Luciano as Mr. Clepp
- Calvin Levels as Deke
- Nick Cave as Freak Storm
- Wilfredo Giovanni Clark as Slick
- Alison Moir as Darlette
- Peter McRobbie as Flip Doubt
- Ron Vawter as Winston
- Dennis Parlato as Dalton
- Tina Louise as Mrs. Fontaine
- Michael Mulheren as Fred Business
- Wayne Maugans as Ned Business
- Catherine Keener as Yvonne
- Tom Jarmusch as Conan
- Samuel L. Jackson as B-Bop
- Ashley Gardner as Ellen

== Production ==
Around 1985, while taking acting classes in New York City, Tom DiCillo was impressed with the local punk movement and the resurgence of rockabilly led by acts like Elvis Costello, The Stray Cats and The Clash. Spinning personal experiences into monologues, he created a character whose vulnerability is obscured by a superficial fifties era cool, exaggerated to the point of foolishness. DiCillo first wove what he had into a one-hour one-man show, before setting the first draft of the screenplay to paper. Eight months later he had completed the fourth draft. Having received positive feedback from his friend Jim Jarmusch (with whom he had attended film school at New York University and had shot his first two films) , DiCillo approached German television, ZDF, who gave him eighty thousand dollars. Additional funding came from the National Endowment for the Arts for twenty-five thousand dollars, as well as a Panavision package and help with the script from the Sundance Lab. Around 1988 to 1989, while at the Cannes Film Festival, DiCillo stumbled into a deal with a South African producer wherein he sold worldwide rights to his film for three hundred thousand dollars; an arrangement he would later call, "A shaky thing but still I felt it was worth the risk so I decided to go ahead with it."

=== Casting ===
Pre-production, early casting, and the search for Johnny quickly followed. By August 1989, having not found what they were looking for in New York, DiCillo and his casting director, Marcia Shulman, went to Los Angeles, where Brad Pitt was the second to last guy seen. DiCillo recalls, "[He] didn’t have much on his resume. In fact he only had two things; he’d done a small Canadian TV series and he’d just finished shooting what he’d listed as his only real film credit — something called Thelma and Louise that no one had heard about because it hadn’t even been edited yet."(Brad Pitt actually had done much film and TV before this audition) Convinced Pitt was Johnny Suede, DiCillo forced the casting on his South African producer, who was thereafter replaced by Ruth Waldburger when the South African's option expired. The film was ultimately shot in Williamsburg, Brooklyn, in 30 days, from November to December 1990.

=== Music ===
Original music for the film was performed by rockabilly guitar legend Link Wray. Subsequently, a version was released on Netflix that removed 8 minutes of Wray's music. DiCillo objected to this version and subsequently was allowed to re-edit the film himself, removing scenes and voiceover that had been added by the distributor.

== Release and reception ==
The film was entered into competition at the Locarno International Film Festival in Switzerland, where it was seen by Mark Tusk from Miramax who, convinced Pitt would become a film star, urged Harvey Weinstein to make the unprecedented step of purchasing the rights to a film he had not yet seen. Johnny Suede won Best Picture at the festival, and the distribution deal was sealed.

The movie reportedly grossed $90,091 at the US box office, against a production budget of $500,000, though this was in one cinema - its widest release.

== Home media ==
The 2009 Anchor Bay release of this film includes an audio commentary track from DiCillo.
