= Evelyn Boyd Granville =

American academic (1924–2023)

- Boyd in 1945
- Born: May 1, 1924; Washington, D.C., U.S.
- Died: June 27, 2023 (aged 99); Silver Spring, Maryland, U.S.
- Education: Smith College, Yale University
- Awards: honorary doctorate: Smith College honorary doctorate: Spelman College Sam A. Lindsey Chair of the University of Texas at Tyler
- Scientific career
- Fields: Mathematics, computer science, education
- Thesis: On Laguerre Series in the Complex Domain (1949)
- Doctoral advisor: Einar Hille

Evelyn Boyd Granville (May 1, 1924 – June 27, 2023) was an American mathematician and computer scientist. She was the second African-American woman to receive a Ph.D. in mathematics from an American university; she earned it in 1949 from Yale University. She graduated from Smith College in 1945. She performed pioneering work in the field of computing.

== Early life and education ==
Evelyn Boyd was born in Washington, D.C.; her father worked odd jobs due to the Great Depression but separated from her mother when Boyd was young. Boyd and her older sister were raised by her mother and aunt, who both worked at the Bureau of Engraving and Printing. She was valedictorian at Dunbar High School, which at that time was a segregated but academically competitive school for black students in Washington.

With financial support from her aunt and a small partial scholarship from Phi Delta Kappa, Boyd entered Smith College in the fall of 1941. She majored in mathematics and physics, but also took a keen interest in astronomy. She was elected to Phi Beta Kappa and to Sigma Xi and graduated summa cum laude in 1945. Encouraged by a graduate scholarship from the Smith Student Aid Society of Smith College, she applied to graduate programs in mathematics and was accepted by both Yale University and the University of Michigan; she chose Yale because of the financial aid they offered. There she studied functional analysis under the supervision of Einar Hille, earning a master's degree in 1946 and finishing her doctorate in 1949, both in mathematics. Her dissertation was "On Laguerre Series in the Complex Domain".

== Career ==
Following graduate school, Boyd went to New York University Institute for Mathematics and performed research and teaching there. After, in 1950, she took a teaching position at Fisk University, a college for black students in Nashville, Tennessee (more prestigious postings being unavailable to black women). Two of her students there, Vivienne Malone-Mayes and Etta Zuber Falconer, went on to earn doctorates in mathematics of their own. But by 1952 she left academia and returned to Washington with a position at the Diamond Ordnance Fuze Laboratories. In January 1956, she moved to IBM as a computer programmer; when IBM received a NASA contract, she moved to Vanguard Computing Center in Washington, D.C.

Boyd moved from Washington to New York City in 1957. In 1960, after marrying Reverend G. Mansfield Collins, Boyd moved to Los Angeles. There she worked for the U.S. Space Technology Laboratories, which became the North American Aviation Space and Information Systems Division in 1962. She worked on various projects for the Apollo program, including celestial mechanics, trajectory computation, and "digital computer techniques".

Forced to move because of a restructuring at IBM, she took a position at California State University, Los Angeles (CSULA) in 1967 as a full professor of mathematics. After retiring from CSULA in 1984 she taught at Texas College in Tyler, Texas for four years, and then in 1990 joined the faculty of the University of Texas at Tyler as the Sam A. Lindsey Professor of mathematics. There she developed elementary school math enrichment programs. Since 1967, Granville was a strong advocate for women's education in tech.

=== Experience of discrimination ===
In 1951 there was a south-eastern sectional meeting of the Mathematical Association of America in Nashville. The citation delivered at the 2007 MAA awards presentation, where Lee Lorch received a standing ovation, recorded:

Lee Lorch, the chair of the mathematics department at Fisk University, and three Black colleagues, Evelyn Boyd (now Granville), Walter Brown, and H. M. Holloway came to the meeting and were able to attend the scientific sessions. However, the organizer for the closing banquet refused to honor the reservations of these four mathematicians. (Letters in Science, August 10, 1951, pp. 161–162 spell out the details). Lorch and his colleagues wrote to the governing bodies of the AMS and MAA seeking bylaws against discrimination. Bylaws were not changed, but non-discriminatory policies were established and have been strictly observed since then.

== Personal life ==
Boyd married Reverend Gamaliel Mansfield Collins in 1961. In 1967, Boyd and Collins divorced. She married realtor Edward V. Granville in 1970. The two moved to Tyler, Texas, in 1983. After Edward passed, she returned to Washington, D.C. in 2010 and settled into retirement, "where she regularly bristled when she heard anyone say that "women can't do math"."

Granville died at her apartment in Silver Spring, Maryland, on June 27, 2023, at the age of 99.

The Evelyn Boyd Granville papers are located in Smith College's Special Collections, and were donated by Granville in 2015.

== Awards and honors ==
In 1989, she was awarded an honorary doctorate by Smith College, the first one given by an American institution to an African-American woman mathematician.

Granville was appointed to the Sam A. Lindsey Chair of the University of Texas at Tyler (1990-1991).

In 1998, Granville was honoured by the National Academy of Engineering.

In 1999, the United States National Academy of Sciences inducted her into its Portrait Collection of African-Americans in Science.

In 2000, she was awarded the Wilbur Lucius Cross Medal, the Yale Graduate School Alumni Association's highest honour.

In 2001, she was cited in the Virginia state senate's Joint Resolution No. 377, Designating February 25 as "African-American Scientist and Inventor Day."

In 2006 she was awarded an honorary degree by Spelman College.

In 2016, technology firm New Relic's Mount Codemore initiative named her as one of "four giants of women's contributions to science and technology".

In 2019, she was recognized by Mathematically Gifted & Black as a Black History Month Honoree.

In 2024, Smith College honored Granville by naming Granville House residence hall after her.

== See also ==
- Euphemia Haynes, another African-American woman who earned a Ph.D. in mathematics even earlier, in 1943.
