= Ernest Green =

Congressional Gold Medal recipient

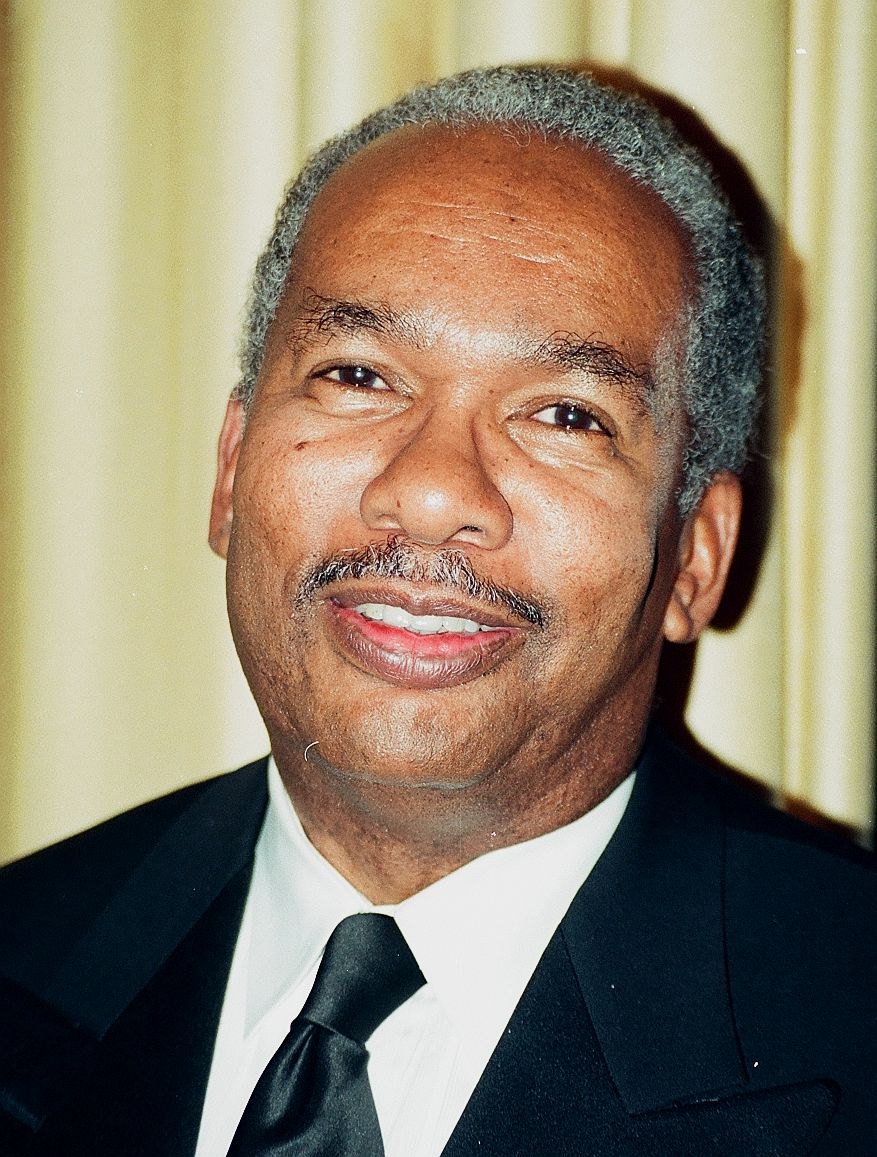
- Green in 1996
- Born: Ernest Gideon Green; September 22, 1941 (age 85); Little Rock, Arkansas, U.S.
- Education: Little Rock Central High School; Horace Mann High School; Michigan State University (BA, MA)
- Movement: Civil rights movement
- Awards: Congressional Gold Medal; Spingarn Medal

Ernest Gideon Green (born September 22, 1941) is one of the Little Rock Nine, a group of African-American students who, in 1957, were the first black students ever to attend classes at Little Rock Central High School in Little Rock, Arkansas. Green was the first African-American to graduate from the school in 1958. In 1999, he and the other members of the Little Rock Nine were awarded the Congressional Gold Medal by President Bill Clinton.

== Early life and education ==
Ernest Green was born in Little Rock, Arkansas in 1941 to Lothaire and Ernest Green, Sr. Ernest had a brother, Scott, and a sister, Treopia Washington.

As a child, Green participated in church activities and was a member of the Boy Scouts of America, eventually earning the rank of Eagle Scout. He attended segregated Dunbar Junior High School and graduated after ninth grade, at which time he was assigned to Horace Mann High School, a new high school for African-Americans.

External videos
- Interview with Ernest Green conducted in 1979 for America, They Loved You Madly, a precursor to Eyes on the Prize. Discussion centers on Green's role as one of the Little Rock Nine during the integration crisis at Central High School. Mr. Green mentions other students, including Melba Pattillo Beals, Minnijean Brown and Elizabeth Eckford.

At the end of his junior year at Horace Mann, Green volunteered to attend the all-white Little Rock Central High School in fall of 1957 and help desegregate one of the nation's largest schools.

Green became the only senior among the nine African Americans who decided to integrate Central High that fall.

Ernest Green made history on May 27, 1958, when he became the first of the Little Rock Nine, and the first African-American, to graduate from Little Rock's Central High School. Martin Luther King Jr., who was in Arkansas to speak at Arkansas Agriculture Mechanical and Normal College’s commencement in Pine Bluff, attended the graduation with the Green family.

Green attended Michigan State University as the beneficiary of a scholarship provided by an anonymous donor. While at Michigan State, Green continued to engage in activism and protests supporting the Civil Rights Movement. He later learned that the anonymous donor was John A. Hannah, the president of Michigan State, and an occasional target of protests by civil rights activists including Green. Green graduated with a Bachelor of Arts in 1962 and a Master's degree in sociology in 1964.

== Career ==
In 1965, Green received an apprenticeship in building trades from the Adolph Institute, a program designed to help minority women in the South with career development issues. From 1968 to 1976, he served as Director of the A. Philip Randolph Education Fund. From 1977 to 1981, he served as an Assistant Secretary of Labor during Jimmy Carter's administration.

From 1981 to 1985 Green was a partner in the firm Green and Herman, and from 1985 to 1986 he owned E. Green and Associates. He previously worked Lehman Brothers, where he was a Managing Director in the fixed income department of the Washington, D.C., office, focusing on public finance. He is also a board member at the Albert Shanker Institute.

Green earned his Eagle Scout Award in 1956 before attending Central High. Over 25 years later, he received the Distinguished Eagle Scout Award which BSA has awarded to fewer than 2000 men who earned Eagle as a Scout. In 2004, he organized the Scoutreach program in Washington, D.C., and served as the program's volunteer chair.

Green served as the board chair of Community Academy Public Charter School, a Washington, D.C., charter school closed in 2015 for fiscal mismanagement. On March 3, 2015 the Attorney General for the District of Columbia filed suit against Green and another board member for having "grossly abused their positions as directors" and "contributed to the school's acting contrary to its non-profit purpose". The suit has since been dismissed and no further charges filed.

== Television portrayals ==
Green has been depicted in two made-for-television movies about the Little Rock Nine. He was portrayed by Calvin Levels in the 1981 CBS movie Crisis at Central High, and by Morris Chestnut in the 1993 Disney Channel movie The Ernest Green Story.

In 1980, he was part of the Milton Friedman (PBS) Free to Choose panel discussion (volume 8 of 10) related to workers rights and the economy.

In 2019, he was portrayed by DeRon Horton on Drunk History: The Little Rock Nine Take on Segregation in Schools, which featured Amandla Stenberg.

== See also ==
- Melba Pattillo Beals
- Nine from Little Rock
