= Plum Bayou Homesteads =

Historic district in Arkansas, United States

- U.S. National Register of Historic Places
- U.S. Historic district
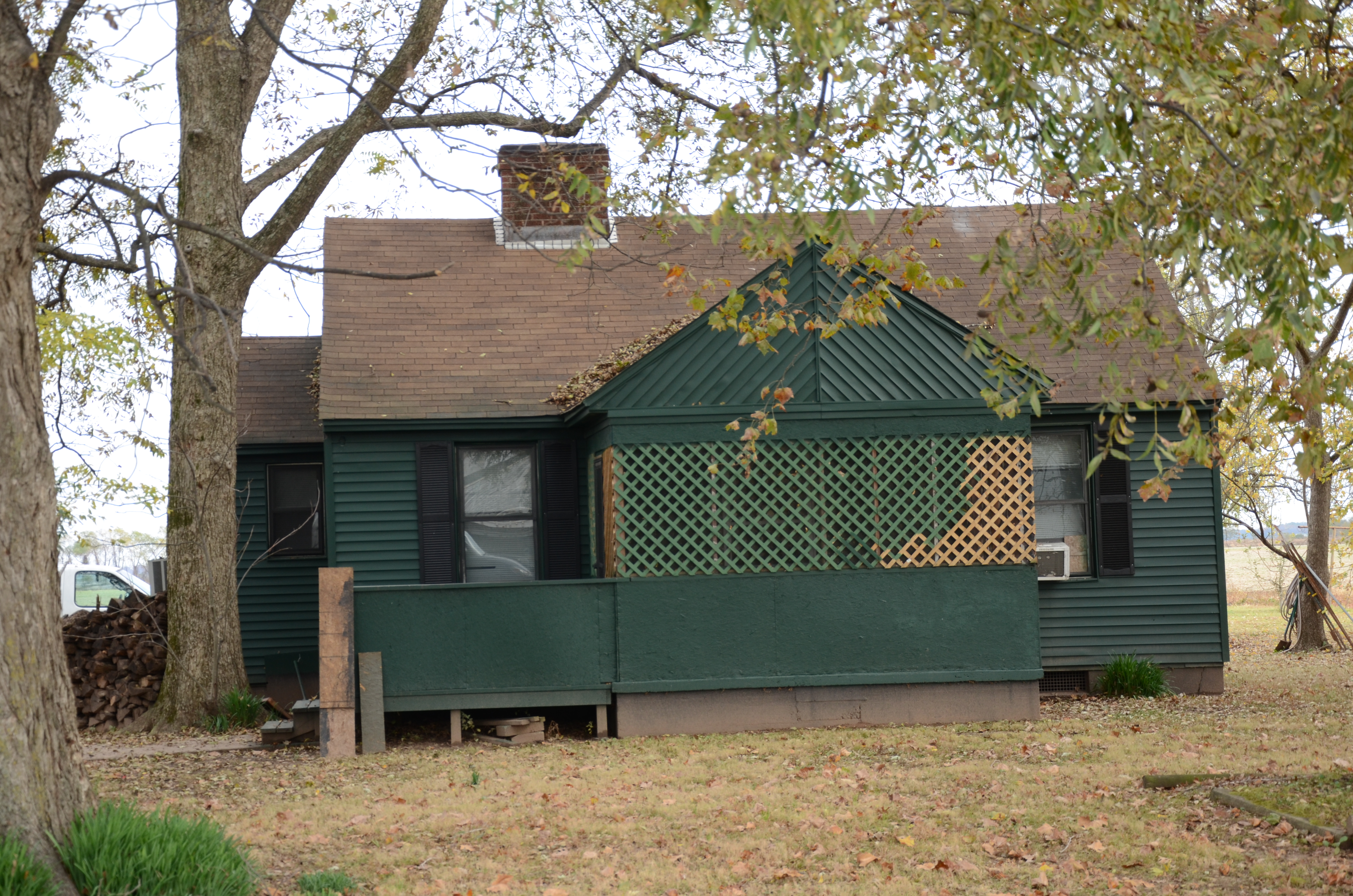

- Location within Arkansas Location within the United States
- Nearest city: Pine Bluff, Arkansas
- Coordinates: 34°25′52″N 92°3′21″W
- Area: 5,307 acres (2,148 ha)
- Built: 1936
- NRHP reference No.: 75000396
- Added to NRHP: June 5, 1975

The Plum Bayou Homesteads are a collection of Depression-era houses that were part of a planned community established by the federal Resettlement Administration. The area, now roughly centered on the unincorporated community of Wright, north of Pine Bluff, had 180 farmsteads developed, each with a farmhouse built to one of several standard plans, and included community buildings that now form a core element of Wright. The district was listed on the National Register of Historic Places in 1975.

== See also ==
- National Register of Historic Places listings in Jefferson County, Arkansas
