= Grace Lorch =

American civil rights activist (c. 1903–1974)

Grace Lonergan Lorch (c. 1903-1974) was an American teacher and civil rights activist best known for her work as a white escort for the Little Rock Nine.

Lorch was a teacher in Boston and served as President of the Boston Teachers Union and as a member of the Boston Central Labour Council. She was the first teacher to challenge a Boston school regulation that female teachers resign after marriage, although unsuccessfully.

Grace Lonergan married her husband Lee Lorch in 1943 as he was about to leave for military service in World War II. Despite having been a teacher for two decades she was dismissed due to an 1880s era rule of the Boston School Committee that banned female teachers from marrying. Lorch appealed but the committee upheld the rule in 1944 and the publicity around Lorch's case led to a campaign to end the prohibition which was successful nine years later when, in 1953, the legislature voted to end the ban on married female teachers.

The Lorches were activists in the civil rights struggle in the 1940s and 1950s. They and their infant daughter, Alice, moved into New York City's Stuyvesant Town and fought to desegregate the housing development bringing the issue to a head by allowing a black family to live in their apartment as guests. The controversy cost Lee Lorch his job as a math professor and the Lorches moved to the South where Lee found work with historically black colleges ultimately ending up at Philander Smith College in Little Rock, Arkansas. Two weeks after moving to Little Rock, Grace Lorch wrote a letter to the local school superintendent asking that eleven-year-old Alice be allowed to attend the neighbourhood school: "Since we live at 1801 High Street, located in a Negro neighborhood, this would be a Negro school," she wrote, adding that it "might also provide a useful and unobtrusive example of benefit to the process of integrating Little Rock schools." The request was denied.

In 1957, the Lorches were involved in the Little Rock branch of the NAACP and were intimately involved in the Little Rock Nine's struggle to desegregate Little Rock Central High School. On their first day of school, the Nine were to arrive together; however, this instruction never reached fifteen-year-old Elizabeth Eckford who arrived separately and found herself facing an angry mob threatening to lynch her. Grace Lorch arrived, having just dropped off her daughter at a nearby junior high, rescued Eckford and escorted her home. Lorch's rescue of Eckford made the Lorches a target. Dynamite was placed in their garage, they were harassed in the press, Alice faced bullying at school and Grace was subpoenaed by the Senate Subcommittee on Internal Security.

By 1959, Lee Lorch found himself blacklisted, and the family moved to Canada, where Grace died in 1974.
