= Elizabeth Eckford =

Member of the Little Rock Nine (born 1941)

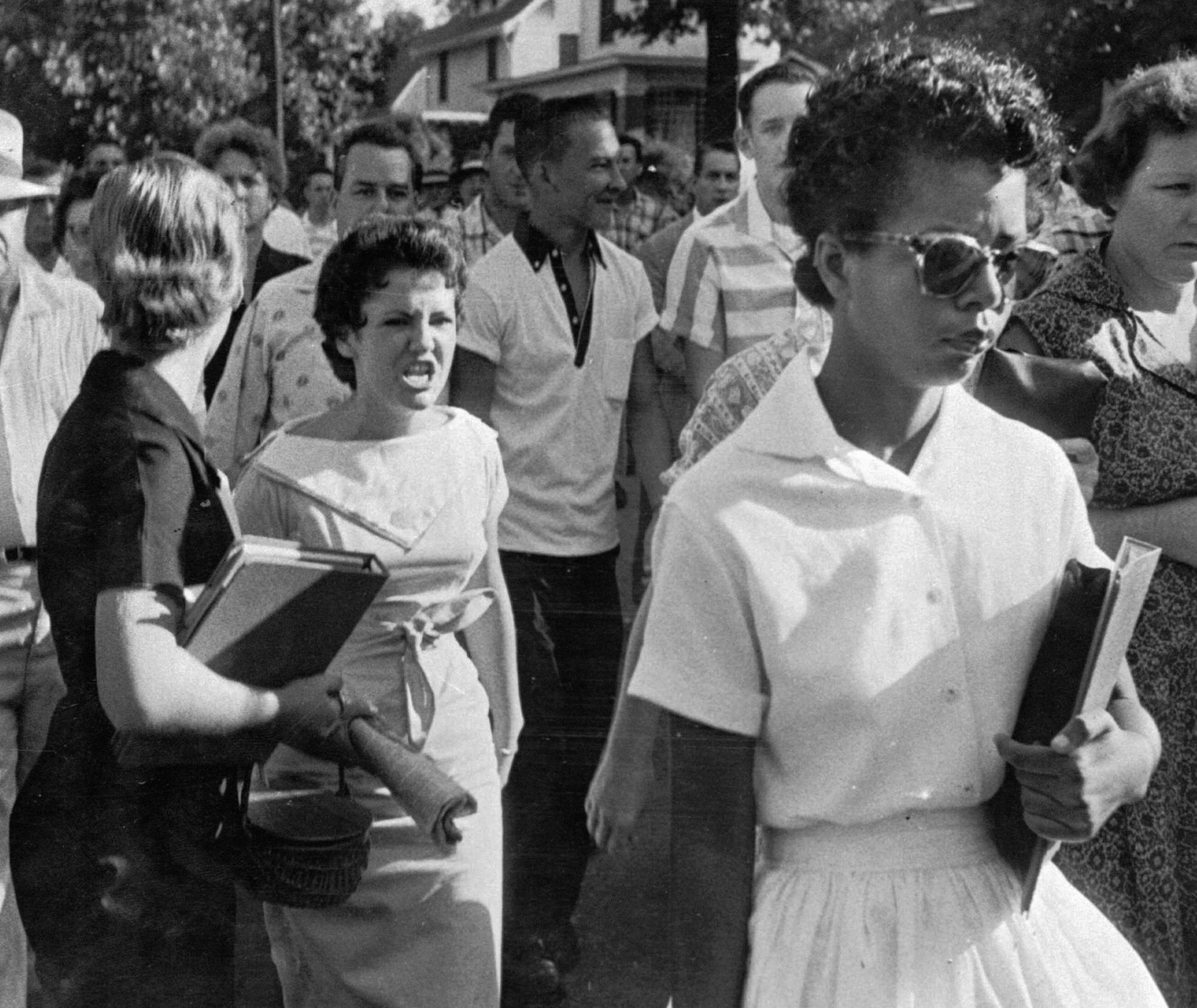
- Eckford, age 15, pursued by a group, with Hazel Massery, age 15, directly behind, at Little Rock Central High School on the first day of the school year on September 4, 1957
- Born: Elizabeth Ann Eckford; October 4, 1941 (age 85); Little Rock, Arkansas, U.S.
- Education: Knox College (HonD); Central State University (BA)
- Movement: Civil rights movement
- Children: 2 (1 deceased)
- Parent(s): Oscar and Birdie Eckford
- Awards: Congressional Gold Medal; Father Joseph Biltz Award; Spingarn Medal

Elizabeth Ann Eckford (born October 4, 1941) is an American civil rights activist and one of the Little Rock Nine, a group of African American students who, in 1957, were the first black students ever to attend classes at the previously all-white Little Rock Central High School in Little Rock, Arkansas. The integration came as a result of the 1954 United States Supreme Court ruling Brown v. Board of Education. Eckford's public experience was captured by press photographers on the morning of September 4, 1957, after she was prevented from entering the school by the Arkansas National Guard. A dramatic snapshot by Will Counts of the Arkansas Democrat showed the young girl being followed by an angry white group; this and other photos of the day's startling events were circulated around the US and the world by the press.

Counts's image was the unanimous selection by the Pulitzer jury for a 1958 Pulitzer Prize, but since the story had earned then-rival Arkansas Gazette two other Pulitzer Prizes already, the Pulitzer board awarded the prize to another photographer for a pleasant photograph of a two-year-old boy in Washington, D.C. A different photo taken by Counts of Alex Wilson, a black reporter for the Memphis Tri-State Defender being beaten by the angry mob in Little Rock the same day, was chosen as the "News Picture of the Year" for 1957 by the National Press Photographers Association. This image by Counts prompted President Dwight D. Eisenhower to send federal troops to Little Rock.

Eckford only spent one year at Little Rock Central High where she and the other black students were tormented throughout. In the years since, she has struggled through life, and twice attempted suicide. She was subsequently diagnosed with post-traumatic stress disorder.

== Background ==
On September 4, 1957, Eckford and eight other African American students (known as the Little Rock Nine) made an unsuccessful attempt to enter Little Rock Central High School, which had been segregated. An angry mob of about 400 surrounded the school that day, with the complicity of the Arkansas National Guard.

Fifteen-year-old Eckford tried to enter the school, while soldiers of the National Guard, under orders from Arkansas Governor Orval Faubus, stepped in her way to prevent her from entering. Eventually, she gave up and tried to flee to a bus stop through the mob of segregationists who surrounded and threatened to lynch her. Once Eckford got to the bus stop, she couldn't stop crying. A reporter, Benjamin Fine, having in mind his own 15-year-old daughter, sat down next to Eckford. He tried to comfort her and told her, "don't let them see you cry." Soon, she was also protected by a white woman named Grace Lorch who escorted her onto a city bus.

The original plan was to have the nine children arrive together, but when the meeting place was changed the night before, the Eckford family's lack of a telephone left Elizabeth uninformed of the change. Instructions were given by Daisy Bates, a strong activist for desegregation, for the nine students to wait for her so that they could all walk together to the rear entrance of the school. This last-minute change caused Elizabeth to be the first to take a different route to school, walking up to the front entrance completely alone. Elizabeth Eckford's family was not informed of the meeting and didn't know that the school board asked the parents to accompany her. Also, Eckford rode a public bus alone to the segregated school. That day, Elizabeth wore a starched black-and-white dress, and she covered her face under black sunglasses. Elizabeth also held her school book in her hand. As she walked toward the school, Elizabeth was surrounded by a crowd of armed guards and a mob of people, and she did not see any black faces. The mob included men, women, and teenagers (white students) who opposed integration. The white teenagers chanted "Two, four, six, eight, we ain't gonna integrate." Elizabeth attempted to go into the school through the mob but was denied entrance. Eckford walked to a bus bench at the end of the block. Eckford described her experience:

I stood looking at the school— it looked so big! Just then the guards let some white students through. The crowd was quiet. I guess they were waiting to see what was going to happen. When I was able to steady my knees, I walked up to the guard who had let the white students in. He didn't move. When I tried to squeeze past him, he raised his bayonet, and then the other guards moved in and they raised their bayonets. They glared at me with a mean look and I was very frightened and didn't know what to do. I turned around and the crowd came toward me. They moved closer and closer. Somebody started yelling, "Drag her over this tree! Let's take care of that nigger!"

— Elizabeth Eckford, Little Rock, 1957: The First Day, 1979 Southern Exposure article

Even though Elizabeth Eckford would one day be known as a member of the Little Rock Nine, at this point in the school day, she was all alone, making her the first African-American student to integrate a white southern high school.

For the next two weeks, the Little Rock Nine stayed home to study instead of going to the Little Rock Central High School. President Dwight D. Eisenhower was reluctant to do anything about the mob or the rioting. Eisenhower summoned Orval Faubus, the Governor of Arkansas to intervene and asked for the withdrawal of all troops from the high school after Elizabeth Eckford's experience attempting to enter the school the first time.

On September 23, 1957, the Little Rock Nine approached Central High again, and Elizabeth Eckford along with the other eight students, accompanied by city policemen, were let into the high school through a side door while a mob of about 1000 people surrounded the school again as the students attempted to enter. The reaction from the mob was described as follows:

The crowd let out a roar of rage. "They've gone in," a man shouted...Once the Little Rock Nine entered the school, they were separated. The mob infiltrated the school, and under threats of death, the nine were taken to the principal's office. One of the nine overheard officials saying "We may have to let the mob have one of those kids, so's we can distract them long enough to get the others out."

President Dwight D. Eisenhower invoked the Insurrection Act of 1807, and the following day, took control of the Arkansas National Guard from the governor and sent the 101st Airborne Division to accompany the students to school for protection. Both federal troops and federalized National Guardsmen were deployed at the school for the entirety of the school year, although they were unable to prevent incidents of violence against the group inside the facility.

All of the city's high schools were closed the following year, so Eckford did not graduate from Central High School. However, she had taken correspondence and night courses, and earned enough credits for her high school diploma. In 1958, Eckford and the rest of the Little Rock Nine were awarded the Spingarn Medal by the National Association for the Advancement of Colored People (NAACP), as was Ms. Bates. In the years since, she has struggled through life, and twice attempted suicide. She was subsequently diagnosed with post-traumatic stress disorder.

== Later life ==
Eckford was accepted by Knox College in Illinois, but chose to return to Little Rock to be near her family. She later attended Central State University in Wilberforce, Ohio, where she earned a BA in history. In 2018, Eckford was awarded an honorary doctorate from Knox College.

Eckford served in the United States Army for five years, first as a pay clerk, and then as an information specialist. She also wrote for the Fort McClellan (Alabama) and the Fort Benjamin Harrison (Indiana) newspapers. After that, she has worked as a waitress, history teacher, welfare worker, unemployment and employment interviewer, and a military reporter. In 2007, she was working as a probation officer in Little Rock.

In 1997, she shared the Father Joseph Biltz Award—presented by the National Conference for Community and Justice—with Hazel Bryan Massery, a then-segregationist student at Central High School who appeared in several of the 1957 photographs screaming at the young Elizabeth. During the reconciliation rally of 1997, the two women made speeches together. But later their friendship broke up, with Eckford reflecting, "[Hazel] wanted me to be cured and be over it and for this not to go on anymore. She wanted me to be less uncomfortable so that she wouldn't feel responsible." In 1999, President Bill Clinton presented the nation's highest civilian award, the Congressional Gold Medal, to the members of the Little Rock Nine.

On the morning of January 1, 2003, one of Eckford's two sons, Erin Eckford, age 26, was shot and killed by police in Little Rock. The Arkansas Democrat-Gazette reported that the police officers had unsuccessfully tried to disarm him with a beanbag round after he had fired several shots from his rifle. When Eckford pointed his rifle towards them, the police officers shot him. His mother feared that his death was "suicide by police". Erin, she said, had suffered from mental illness but had been off his prescribed medication for several years. The newspaper later reported that prosecutors investigating the fatal shooting had decided that the police officers concerned were justified in shooting Eckford.

In 2018, 60 years after leaving Little Rock Central High, Eckford told her story in her first autobiography, The Worst First Day: Bullied While Desegregating Little Rock Central High. The book was coauthored with Dr. Eurydice Stanley and Grace Stanley of Pensacola, Florida. Grace was 15 years old when she worked on the project, the same age Eckford was when she desegregated Central High. The Worst First Day tells Eckford's experiences in verse. It features the graphic artwork of Rachel Gibson and the photography of Will Counts. Eckford traveled to New Zealand in 2019 to teach American civil rights history to more than 4,000 students with Dr. Stanley at the request of high school teacher Roydon Agent, author of Public Image, Private Shame.

On November 19, 2022, Elizabeth Eckford spoke at the keel-laying ceremony of the attack submarine USS Arkansas (SSN-800) at Newport News Shipbuilding in Newport News, Virginia, after she and Ernest Green, Gloria Ray Karlmark, Carlotta Walls LaNier and Thelma Mothershed-Wair etched their initials onto metal plates that were then welded onto the keel. The plates will remain affixed to the submarine throughout its life. Melba Pattillo Beals and Minnijean Brown-Trickey were also named sponsors of the ship, and all members of the Little Rock Nine were honored. Eckford said "(Former Navy) Secretary Ray Mabus asked us to be supporters of the ship and its crew. I signed on to be a foster grandmother...President Eisenhower sent 1,000 paratroopers to Little Rock to disperse a mob, bring order, and they made it possible for us to enter Central High School. From that point, I've had very high regard for specially trained forces."

== Media portrayals ==
Actress Lisa Marie Russell portrayed Eckford in the Disney Channel movie The Ernest Green Story (1993). Amandla Stenberg portrayed Eckford during a segment on the show Drunk History (2019).

== Bibliography ==
Notes

References

- "Elizabeth Eckford". America.gov. United States Department of State. August 30, 2007. Archived from the original on May 31, 2009.
- "Son of a Civil Rights Trailblazer Is Killed". Los Angeles Times. The Associated Press. January 3, 2003.
- Beals, Melba Patillo (2007). Warriors Don't Cry (2007 ed.). Simon & Schuster Children's Publishing. ISBN 978-1-4169-4882-7.
- Counts, Will (2007). A Life Is More Than a Moment: The Desegregation of Little Rock's Central High. Indiana University Press. ISBN 9780253217936.
- Lucas, Dean (January 31, 2012). "Elizabeth Eckford at Little Rock". famouspictures.org.
- Masur, Louis P. (October 16, 2011). "Blacks, Whites, and Grays". chronicle.com.
- Margolick, David (September 24, 2007). "Through a Lens, Darkly". Vanity Fair.
- Roberts, Gene; Klibanoff, Hank (2007). The Race Beat: The Press, the Civil Rights Struggle, and the Awakening of a Nation (2007 ed.). Vintage. ISBN 978-0-679-73565-6.
- Williams, Juan (September 21, 2007). "Daisy Bates and the Little Rock Nine". NPR.
- Eckford, Elizabeth; Stanley, Eurydice; Stanley, Grace (2018). The Worst First Day: Bullied While Desegregating Little Rock Central High. Lamp Press. ISBN 9780999766170.
