= List of African American newspapers in Texas =

Texas African American newspapers from 1868 to the present

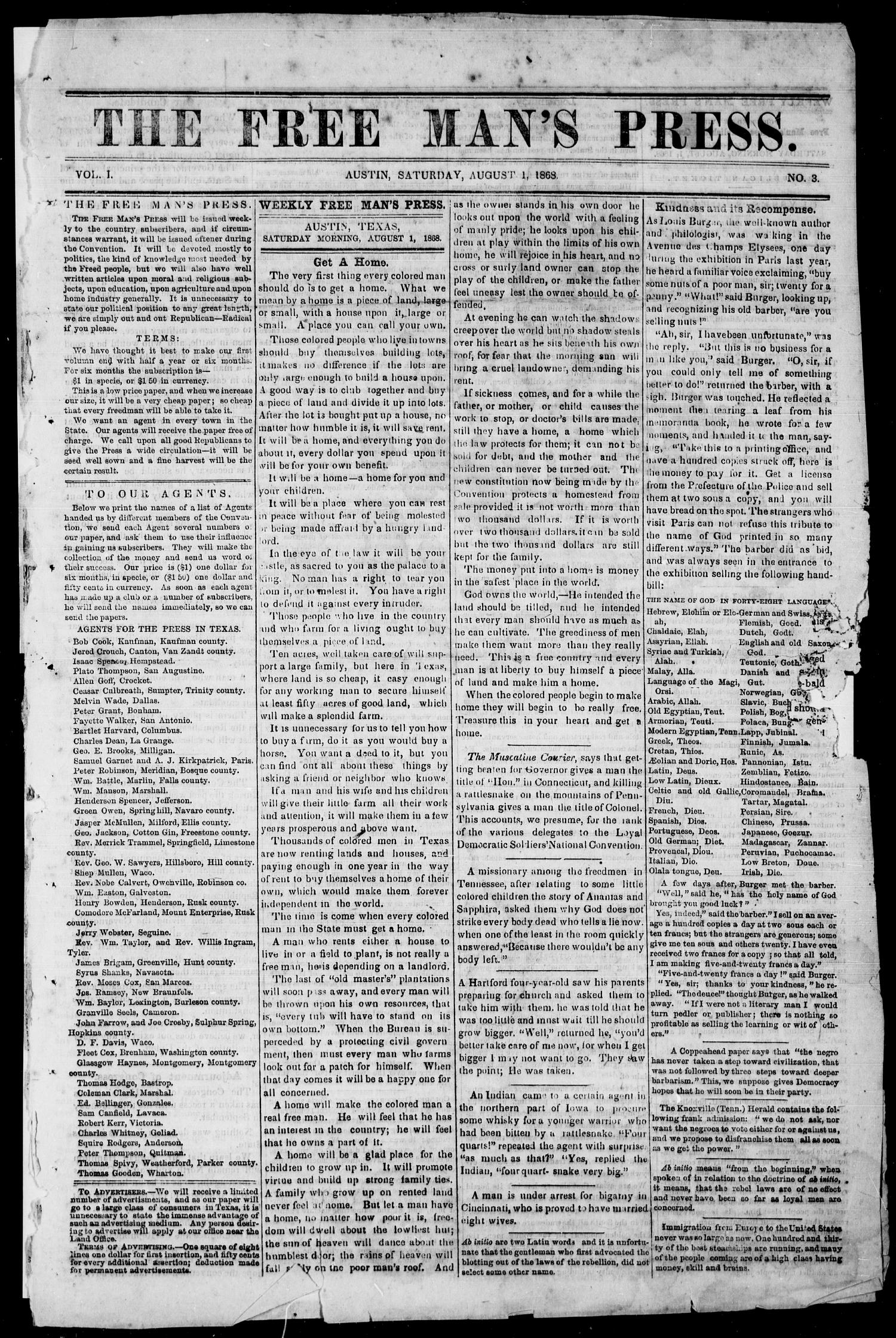
Front page of The Free Man's Press from August 1, 1868.

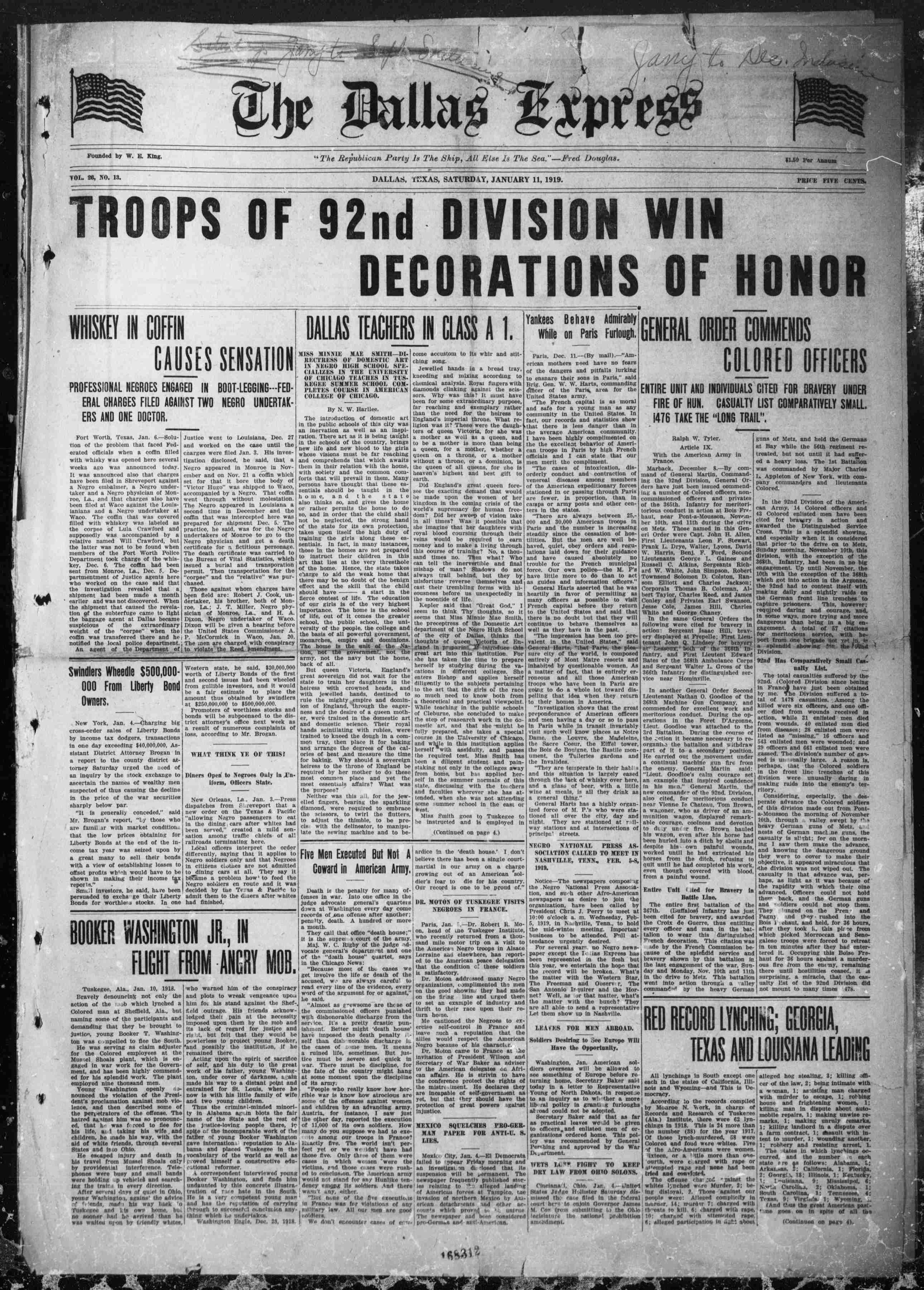
Front page of The Dallas Express from January 11, 1919, celebrating the award of military honors to soldiers of the 92nd Infantry Division.

This is a list of African American newspapers that have been published in Texas. It includes both current and historical newspapers. The history of such newspapers in Texas begins shortly after the Civil War, with the publication of The Free Man's Press in 1868.

Many African American newspapers are published in Texas today, including three in Houston alone. These current newspapers are highlighted in green in the list below.

== Newspapers ==
City	Title	Beginning	End	Frequency	Call numbers	Remarks
Austin	Capital City Argus / Capital City Argus and Interracial Review	1962	1980s	Weekly	LCCN sn86088242, sn87090674, sn87091252; OCLC 17188802, 13895357, 16543454	Published by Arthur Sims.
Austin / Galveston	The Free Man's Press / The Freedman's Press	1868	1868	Weekly	LCCN sn83025750, sn83025751, 2011254377; OCLC 753805840, 211233, 2611264, 2810120, 9788265, 9791586	Free online archive; Edited by Melving C. Keith.; Published from July to October 1868. Final issue published in Galveston.
Austin	The Gold Dollar	1876	?	Unknown	LCCN sn86088312, 2004221227; OCLC 56664003, 14049728	Published by Jacob Fontaine.
Austin	The Herald / The Sunday School Herald	1891	1892	Weekly	LCCN sn91072504, sn87090941; OCLC 16820843, 24359041	Published by the Education Board of the General Baptist Convention of Texas.; Editors included L.L. Campbell and M.M. Haynes.; Attested through at least 1917.
Austin	The Illustrated News	1923	?	Weekly	LCCN sn87090921; OCLC 16814934	Edited by W.I. Solomon.
Austin	Austin Informer	1905	1900s		LCCN sn86088249; OCLC 13895004	
Austin	Austin Mirror / The Austin Mirror	1958	1900s	Weekly	LCCN sn87090496; OCLC 16110553	Published by Walter McBride. Edited by Dora H. Moore.
Austin	Nokoa : The Observer	1987	2019	Weekly	LCCN sn92066431; OCLC 17420611	Founded and operated by Akwasi Evans.
Austin	Austin Searchlight	1896?	?	Weekly	OCLC 16530193	Published and edited by William P. Mabson.
Austin	Austin Sun	1992		Weekly	OCLC 31889841	Published by Dorris Ellis.
Austin / Waco	Texas Interracial Review / The Texas Interracial Review	1941 or 1940	1962	Monthly or twice monthly	LCCN sn86088095; OCLC 13944173	Published by Mason Smith.; Merged with Capital City Argus to form the Capital City Argus and Interracial Review.
Austin	The Tribune / Tribune	1970	?	Weekly	LCCN sn87090933; OCLC 16816350	Attested through at least 1979.
Austin	The Villager	1973	current	Weekly	LCCN sn89080102, sn86088329; OCLC 13988074, 24227435	Official site; Edited and published by Tommy L. Wyatt.
Austin	The Weekly Bulletin	?	1900s	Weekly	LCCN sn92066423; OCLC 26508765	Attested from at least 1906.; Published by Bulletin Pub. Co.
Beaumont	Beaumont Informer	1934	?	Weekly		
Beaumont	The Industrial Era	1904?	?	Weekly		
Bryan	Silhouette	1900s	?	Bimonthly newspaper	LCCN sn88084228; OCLC 18473755	
Corpus Christi	Corpus Christi Weekly	1960?	?	Weekly	OCLC 1420174	Edited by Reynell Parkins.
Corsicana	Oil City Afro-American	1898	1901	Weekly	LCCN sn83026367, 2014254013; OCLC 851189664, 2755111, 9843592	
Dallas	The African Herald	1992	?	Monthly newspaper	ISSN 1069-8205; LCCN sn93007490; OCLC 26849024	
Dallas	Dallas Community Leader	1987	?	Biweekly		Published by Valerie Ballard.; Attested through at least 1990.
Dallas	Elite News	1968?		Biweekly	OCLC 17845541	Published by William Blair Jr.
Dallas	The Dallas Express	1893	1970	Weekly	LCCN 2011254359, sn83025779; OCLC 747836163, 9839625; ISSN 2331-334X, 2331-3358	Free online archive
Dallas	Dallas Gazette	1913?	?	Weekly	LCCN sn93068248; OCLC 28865607	Published by J.H. Owens and Company.; Attested through at least 1938.
Dallas	In Sepia	1959?	?	Weekly		Published by Davis and Associates.
Dallas	Dallas Independent Press	1969	?	Weekly	LCCN sn87090677; OCLC 16566401	Published by R.R. Fagan. Edited by Don L. Fagan.
Dallas	The Item	1891	1900	Weekly	LCCN sn83025788; OCLC 27553572, 9839595	Published by J.G. Griffin and Ellis Willis.
Dallas	The Key News	1962	?	Weekly	OCLC 17845380	Published and edited by Al Smith.
Dallas	The Link	1985	?	Weekly or monthly	LCCN sn87090861; OCLC 16767250	
Dallas	The Metroplex News	1977	?	Weekly	OCLC 17845462	Published by R.G. Stinson and Son.
Dallas	North Dallas Community News	1987?	?	Weekly		Published by Rick Grant.
Dallas	Dallas Post Tribune / The Dallas Post Tribune / The Dallas Star Post / The Post Tribune	1950	current	Weekly	LCCN sn83005940, sn8305940, sn84024125, sn84024131; OCLC 10247179, 10566173, 10566190, 17574276, 22619572; ISSN 0746-7303	Official site
Dallas	The Pythias and Calanthean Review	1979?	?	Quarterly newspaper		
Dallas	St. Paul United Methodist	1971?	?	Weekly		Edited by Spurgeon M. Dunnan III.
Dallas	Texas Community Leader	1991?		Weekly		Published by Valerie Ballard.
Dallas	The Times Review	1968?	?	Unknown		
Dallas	The Dallas Weekly	1954	current	Weekly	LCCN sn85006271; OCLC 8294783, 1984783; ISSN 0885-1271	Official site; Published by James A. Washington.
Denison	The Gate City Bulletin	1913?	?	Weekly		Published by Owens Publishing Co.
Fort Worth	The Texas Times	1977	1993	Daily	OCLC 26912658	Published by Woodie Webber.
Fort Worth	Bronze Texan News	1900s	1900s		LCCN 2011254259, sn88083026; OCLC 17364214, 717514356	Attested from at least 1968–1969.
Fort Worth	Fort Worth Como Monitor	1941?	?	Monthly newspaper		Published by Raymond Hart.
Fort Worth	Dallas District Crusader	1900s	1900s	Weekly	LCCN 2011254296; OCLC 747822934	
Fort Worth	Ebony Mart	1970s	?	Weekly	LCCN sn95078909; OCLC 32210855	
Fort Worth	Fort Worth Mind	1900s	1900s	Weekly	LCCN 2011254372, sn87090896; OCLC 16785055, 664611227	Attested from at least 1943–1944.
Fort Worth	The Torchlight Appeal	1886	1800s	Weekly	LCCN sn83025816; OCLC 9839428	
Fort Worth	USA Monitor	1990 or 1992	?	Monthly newspaper	ISSN 2640-4893; LCCN 2017235067, 2013254355; OCLC 664611420, 27110188	Published by Earl L. Burrell.
Galveston	The Galveston Banner	1925?	1937?	Weekly	LCCN sn86090565; OCLC 14629230	
Galveston	City Times	1898?	1927?	Weekly	OCLC 14116247	Edited by William H. Noble, Jr.
Galveston	The Colored American / The Colored American: A Defender of the Race	1920	?	Weekly	LCCN sn86088469; OCLC 14117617	
Galveston	Galveston Examiner	1938	1940	Weekly	LCCN sn86088470, sn87090350; OCLC 14117806, 15923921	
Galveston	Freeman’s Journal / The Freeman’s Press	1887	1891	Weekly	LCCN sn83025776; OCLC 25694294, 9839575	
Galveston	Galveston Guide	1937	?	Weekly	LCCN sn86088468; OCLC 14117476	
Galveston	The Informer (Galveston Edition)	1918	1937?	Biweekly	LCCN sn86088473; OCLC 14118111	
Galveston	Galveston Informer	1939	?	Unknown	LCCN sn86088472; OCLC 14118037	
Galveston	The Galveston New Idea	1896	1920	Weekly	LCCN sn86088475; OCLC 14118188	
Galveston	Taborian Banner	1905	?	Monthly	OCLC 18104753	Published by W. Hartley Jackson.
Galveston	The Galveston Voice	1931	1962?	Weekly	LCCN sn86088471; OCLC 14117979	Published by C. W. Rice.
Gonzales	The Conservative Counselor	1909	1900s	Weekly	LCCN sn91072535; OCLC 24767980	"Official organ of the Mt. Zion Sunday School Convention."
Houston	African-American News and Issues	1996	current	Weekly	OCLC 64773108	Weekly circulation of 113,000.
Houston	The Houston Call	1970	?	Weekly	LCCN sn87090887; OCLC 16784184	
Houston	The Call	1919?	?	Weekly		Published by C.A. Franklin.
Houston	Houston Defender	1930	current	Weekly	LCCN sn86089622; OCLC 14393467	Official site
Houston	The Texas Examiner	1942	1900s	Weekly	LCCN sn86089623; OCLC 14393439	Attested through at least 1946.
Houston	Forward Times / Houston Forward Times	1960	current	Weekly	LCCN sn84024126, sn86090555; OCLC 10552835, 17563536, 2406092, 3968075	Published by Julius Carter.; Official site
Houston	Freedmen's Journal	1983	?	Monthly newspaper	LCCN sn89048268; OCLC 20750573	
Houston	The Independent	1898	1905	Weekly	LCCN sn83025786, 2012254024; OCLC 773196693, 9839546	Published by Crawford and Osborne.
Houston	Informer and Texas Freeman / The Houston Informer / The Informer	1919	?	Weekly	LCCN sn84024122, sn84024124, sn84042123, sn91027149; OCLC 10549579, 24775709, 10566210	Published and edited by George McElroy.
Houston	Metropolitan	1961	1900s		LCCN sn86089635; OCLC 14393445	
Houston	The Negro Labor News	1930	?	Weekly	LCCN sn86089626; OCLC 14393398	Official organ of the Texas Negro Business and Laboring Men's Association.
Houston	Houston Newspages	1986	?	Weekly	OCLC 25559036	Published by Francis Page Sr. Edited by Diana Fallis.
Houston	The Odd Fellow Budget	1920?	?	Monthly newspaper		
Houston	Old Ironsides' Monthly	1947	?	Monthly newspaper	LCCN sn86089369; OCLC 14289561	
Houston	Texas State University Herald	1947	?	Monthly newspaper	LCCN sn87090891; OCLC 16784691	
Houston	The Houston Sun	1982	current	Weekly	LCCN sn93002908; OCLC 27155880; ISSN 1071-2941	Official site
Houston	USAfrica Weekend	1997	?	Monthly newspaper	OCLC 38191407	Published by Chido Nwangwu.; Billed as “The social diary of the African, Caribbean, African American & American communities.”
Houston	The Voice Of Hope / Voice of Hope	1968?	1975?	Weekly	LCCN sn84025929; OCLC 10729243	
Houston	The Western Star	1881 or 1893	1932	Weekly	LCCN sn88083137, sn88084224, 2013254366, sn83025785; OCLC 9856536, 850605415, 18472922, 3953475	
Longview	The New Southern Times	1996	?	Biweekly	OCLC 36217456	Published and edited by Mitch Mitchell.
Lubbock	Lubbock Digest	1977	1982	Biweekly	LCCN sn86089670; OCLC 14399405	
Lubbock	The Manhattan Heights And West Texas Times / The Manhattan Heights Times	1961	1960s	Weekly	LCCN sn86089778, sn86089648; OCLC 14399370, 14407646	Became The Manhattan Heights and West Texas Times in 1965.
Lubbock	West Texas Times	1962?	?	Weekly	LCCN sn86089686; OCLC 14399323	
Lubbock	Southwest Digest	1982	current	Weekly	LCCN sn86089671; OCLC 14399287	
Prairie View	Prairie View City News	1969?	?	Biweekly		Published and edited by F.G. Fry.
Prairie View	The Tribune Review	1996?	?	Biweekly	OCLC 36217551	
Prairie View	Waller County Tribune	1989	?	Biweekly		Published and edited by Dewayne Charlston.
Richardson	African News Watch	1996		Monthly		Edited by Donald Ugwu.
San Antonio	Hephzibah-Herald	1920?	?	Weekly		
San Antonio	San Antonio Informer	1988 or 1944	?	Weekly	LCCN sn87090871; OCLC 16773922	Published and edited by Tommy L. Moore.
San Antonio	San Antonio Inquirer	1906	?	Weekly	OCLC 14708058	Published by G.W. Bouldin.
San Antonio	The People’s Eye Opener	1926?	?	Weekly		
San Antonio	Snap	1990?	?	Unknown	OCLC 32178679	Published by Eugene E. Coleman. Edited by Margie Randle Bailey.
Taylor	Shining Star	1959	?	Weekly	OCLC 18122110	Published by Cabins Publishing Company. Edited by Mrs Joe Callins.
Temple	The Apostolic Bulletin	1918	?		LCCN 00064000; OCLC 43452018	
Texarkana	Texarcana Courier	1977?	?	Weekly		Published by Elridge Robertson. Edited by Ivy Jeanne Steele.
Tyler	The Tyler Leader	1900s	?	Weekly	LCCN sn95078920; OCLC 33020107	
Waco	Cen-Tex Reflections	1984	?	Weekly	LCCN sn87091139; OCLC 16946952	
Waco	Waco Good News	1880	?	Weekly	LCCN sn87090745; OCLC 16687041	
Waco	The Helping Hand	?	?	Monthly newspaper	LCCN sn87090828; OCLC 16734762	
Waco	The Waco Messenger	1932	?	Weekly	LCCN sn87090309; OCLC 15788967	
Waco	Paul Quinn Weekly	1900	1916	Weekly	LCCN sn83025787, 2014254016; OCLC 870187587, 2753958, 9839507	Published by Paul Quinn College.
Washington	Prince Hall Masonic Digest	1973?	?	Quarterly		

== See also ==
- List of African American newspapers and media outlets
- List of African American newspapers in Arkansas
- List of African American newspapers in Louisiana
- List of African American newspapers in New Mexico
- List of African American newspapers in Oklahoma
- List of newspapers in Texas

== Works cited ==
- Danky, James Philip; Hady, Maureen E., eds. (1998). African-American newspapers and periodicals: a national bibliography. Harvard University Press. ISBN 9780674007888.
- Smallwood, James (1983). "Arkansas". In Suggs, Henry Lewis (ed.). The Black Press in the South, 1865–1979. ISBN 9780313222443.
- Smith, Jessie Carney (2012). Black Firsts: 4,000 Ground-Breaking and Pioneering Historical Events. Visible Ink Press. ISBN 9781578593699.
