= List of African American newspapers in Arkansas =

List of Arkansas African-American newspapers

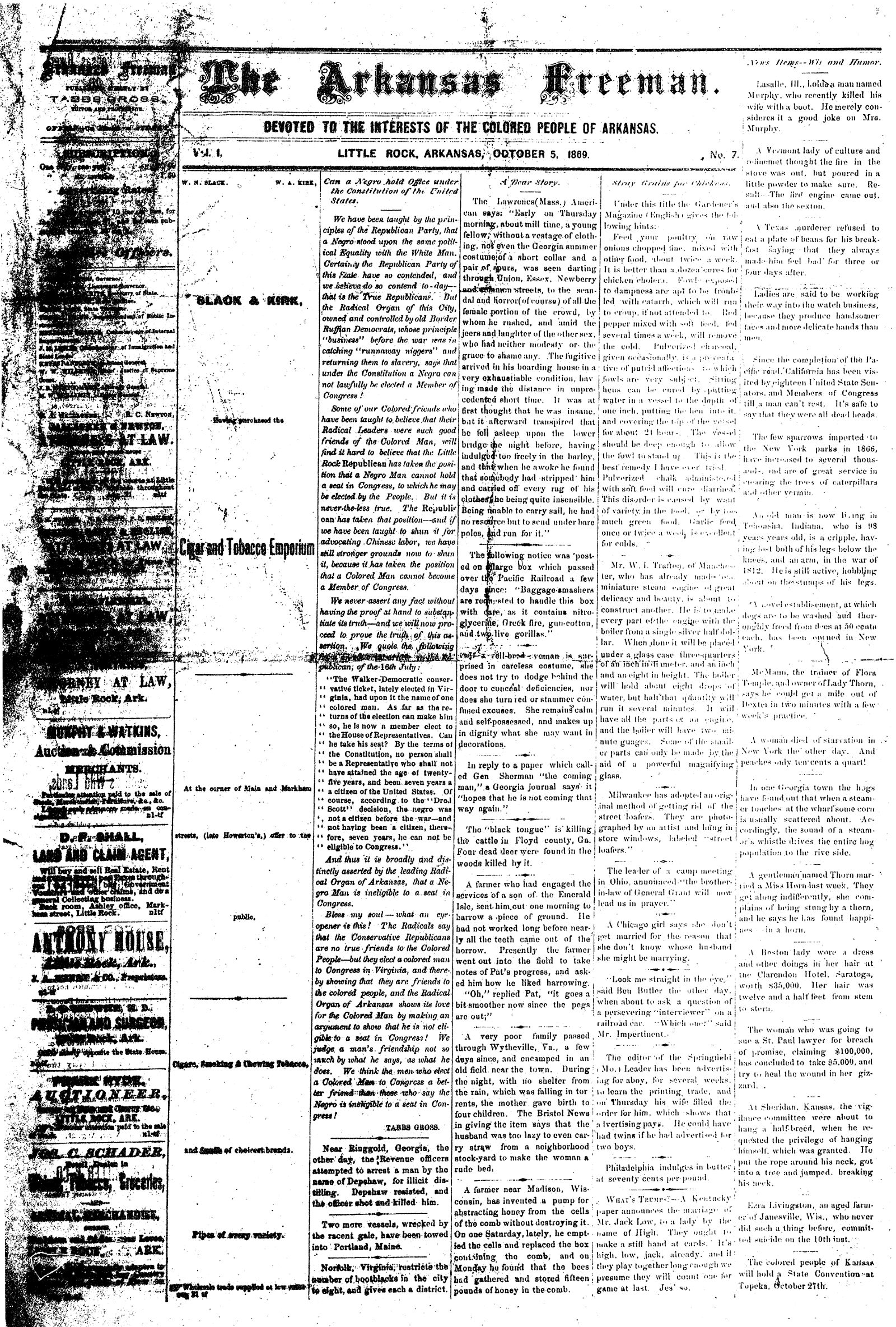
Front page of the Arkansas Freeman from 1869.

This is a list of African American newspapers that have been published in Arkansas. The first such newspaper in Arkansas was the Arkansas Freeman of Little Rock, which began publishing in 1869.

== Newspapers ==
City	Title	Beginning	End	Frequency	Call numbers	Remarks
Baxter, Drew County	The Baxter Vidette	1902	1900s	Twice monthly	LCCN sn90050275; OCLC 22286393	
Earle	The Eastern Arkansas World	1940	1900s	Weekly	LCCN sn2003062301; OCLC 53001363	
Fayetteville	Times	1976	1977	Irregular	ISSN 2469-9209; LCCN 2015203720; OCLC 774693301	
Forrest City	The Forrest City Herald	1896	?	Weekly	LCCN sn90050374; OCLC 22971599	“Devoted to Religious and Literary Work. Motto: Never Give Up.”
Forrest City	Homeland / Home With Homeland (1998–)	1991	?	Monthly newspaper	Homeland: ISSN 2575-1506; LCCN 2012254011, sn93050529; OCLC 664577985, 27819821; Home With Homeland: LCCN 2012254010; OCLC 773145186	Attested through at least 1999.; Edited by Henerine Hunter. Published by Curtis Varnado.
Forrest City	The Southern Liberator	?	1900s		LCCN sn89051440; OCLC 20661226	Attested from at least 1936.; Official organ of the Southern Liberal Organization.
Fort Smith	The Appreciator-Union	190?	?	Unknown	LCCN sn98062576; OCLC 40250458	Attested from at least 1911.
Helena	The Inter State Reporter	1886?	?	Weekly		
Helena	The New Era	1891	?	Weekly	LCCN sn92050100; OCLC 26018049	
Helena	The Reporter	1891	1907	Twice monthly	LCCN sn84020667, sn83025486; OCLC 4054398, 9526584	Edited by W.A. Holmes.
Hot Springs	The Arkansas Citizen / The Citizen (1958–1963)	1958	1977 or 1980s	Biweekly	The Arkansas Citizen: LCCN sn89051269; OCLC 4392536; The Citizen: LCCN sn89051276; OCLC 19988148	Published and edited by Kenneth Adair.
Hot Springs	Hot Springs Echo	1901?	?	Weekly	LCCN sn89051273; OCLC 19988117	Edited by Edward S. Lockhart.
Hot Springs	The Negro Voice	1933	1900s	Weekly	LCCN sn89051284; OCLC 19988210	
Jacksonville / Little Rock	Southern Mediator / Southern Mediator Journal (1938–1978)	1938	1985?	Weekly	ISSN 2639-0396, 2639-0388; LCCN 2014254327, sn83025479, sn90050029; OCLC 12832408	Published at Little Rock from approximately December 14, 1979 to January 13, 1984.
Little Rock	The American Guide	1889	1906	Weekly	LCCN 2011254032, sn83025496; OCLC 707936047, 9529432	Edited by D.G. Hill.
Little Rock	Arkansas Carrier	1976?	?	Weekly	LCCN sn93050486; OCLC 28287749	
Little Rock	Arkansas Freeman / The Arkansas Freeman	1869	1871	Weekly	LCCN 2011254042, sn83025492; OCLC 707940130, 9527477, 2640811	Published and edited by Tabbs Gross.
Little Rock	Arkansas State Press	1941	1959	Weekly	LCCN 2011254351, sn84025840; OCLC 707940147, 10434302, 10766826	Published by L. Christopher Bates and Daisy Bates.; Took a leadership role in the battle against segregation in Arkansas.
Little Rock	Arkansas State Press	1984	1998	Weekly	LCCN sn90050043; OCLC 10766826	"Dedicated to the memory of L. Christopher Bates." A revival of the Arkansas State Press of the 1940s and 1950s.
Little Rock	Arkansas Survey	1923	1935	Weekly	LCCN sn92050012; OCLC 25133882	
Little Rock	Arkansas Survey-Journal	1935	1950s	Weekly	LCCN sn92050011; OCLC 25133891	
Little Rock	Arkansas Tribune	1973	1973	Weekly	LCCN sn90050061; OCLC 9903269	
Little Rock	Arkansas Weekly Mansion / Arkansas Mansion	1880	1886	Weekly	LCCN 2011254044, sn84020670; OCLC 715390724, 4065923, 2696488	Edited by Henry Simkens.; Notable for Simkens' unusual position in support of the Supreme Court decision in the Civil Rights Cases of 1883.
Little Rock	Arkansas Weekly Sentinel	1978	1980s	Weekly	LCCN sn92050034; OCLC 25404307	Published and edited by J.F. Cooley.
Little Rock	The Arkansas World	1940	1957	Weekly	LCCN sn92050010; OCLC 25133894	Published by A.G. Shields Jr. Edited by P.L. Dorman.
Little Rock	The Baptist Vanguard	1800s	1800s	Twice monthly	LCCN sn93050523; OCLC 28427823	Attested in at least 1893.
Little Rock	The Black Consumer / The Consumer	1972	1900s	Weekly	LCCN sn93050477; OCLC 10343546, 10343529	Attested through at least 1974.; Edited and published by David W. Walters.
Little Rock	The Mosaic Guide	1898?	1900s	Weekly	LCCN sn93050487; OCLC 28287760	Attested through at least 1909.
Little Rock	The Little Rock Reporter	1901 or 1902	1906	Weekly	LCCN sn92050009; OCLC 25133899	
Little Rock	The Southern Christian Recorder	1885?	?	Weekly	LCCN sn92050008; OCLC 25133910	
Little Rock	State Weekly News	1976	1977	Weekly	LCCN sn92050039; OCLC 25404230	Published and edited by Clarence H. Guy.
Little Rock	The Twin City Press / Twin City Press	1930s or 1940?	1940	Weekly	LCCN sn92050007; OCLC 25133924	Published by Southern Recorder Publishing Company.
Little Rock	The World Picture Magazine	195?	?	Monthly		
Pine Bluff	Arkansas Dispatch	1962	?	Biweekly	LCCN sn89051162; OCLC 9850935	Edited by Elijah Coleman.; Suspended publication between 1962 and July 4, 1975.
Pine Bluff	The Arkansas Mirror	1967	1970	Weekly	LCCN sn90050300; OCLC 22405073	
Pine Bluff	The Negro Spokesman	1900s	1900s	Weekly	LCCN sn93050450; OCLC 27179792	Attested from at least 1941.
Pine Bluff	Pine Bluff Press	1940	?	Weekly	LCCN sn93050474; OCLC 27299502	Published by A.R.D. Thompson.
Pine Bluff	The Weekly Echo	1880s	?	Weekly	LCCN sn93050533; OCLC 28565947	Edited by Jesse C. Duke in 1892.
Pine Bluff	Pine Bluff Weekly Herald	1900	1907	Weekly	LCCN 2014254020, sn84020671; OCLC 876186620, 4054417, 9586261, 2754418	
West Memphis	Many Voices	1971	1900s	Biweekly (irregular)	LCCN sn93050567; OCLC 28824585	

== See also ==
- List of African American newspapers and media outlets
- List of African American newspapers in Mississippi
- List of African American newspapers in Missouri
- List of African American newspapers in Oklahoma
- List of African American newspapers in Tennessee
- List of African American newspapers in Texas
- List of newspapers in Arkansas

== Works cited ==
- Danky, James Philip; Hady, Maureen E., eds. (1998). African-American newspapers and periodicals : a national bibliography. Harvard University Press. ISBN 9780674007888.
- Jones, Allen Woodrow (1983). "Alabama". In Suggs, Henry Lewis (ed.). The Black Press in the South, 1865–1979. ISBN 9780313222443.
- Smith, Calvin (1983). "Arkansas". In Suggs, Henry Lewis (ed.). The Black Press in the South, 1865–1979. ISBN 9780313222443.
- Smith, Jessie Carney (2012). Black Firsts: 4,000 Ground-Breaking and Pioneering Historical Events. Visible Ink Press. ISBN 9781578593699.
