= Family reunification ads after emancipation =

Following the ratification of the Thirteenth Amendment to the Constitution, (Note: Though rare, there were some ads placed prior to widespread emancipation. The Christian Recorder has at least one such ad from 1861.) emancipated African Americans searched for their lost families and placed want ads to reunify with them.

Many families were forcibly separated during slavery. Children were separated from their parents, spouses were removed from one another, and siblings were lost. The process was a traumatic one for the survivors, and both during and after the period of legal slavery, many people searched for their lost families—in some cases, unsuccessfully. Lone survivors placed ads in newspapers across the United States in search of their families, many of which were placed during the nascency of the black press. These "Information Wanted" and "Lost Friends" sections were common, and the Last Seen project, sponsored by Villanova University and Philadelphia's Methodist Episcopal Church, has been digitizing them since 2016.

== Background ==
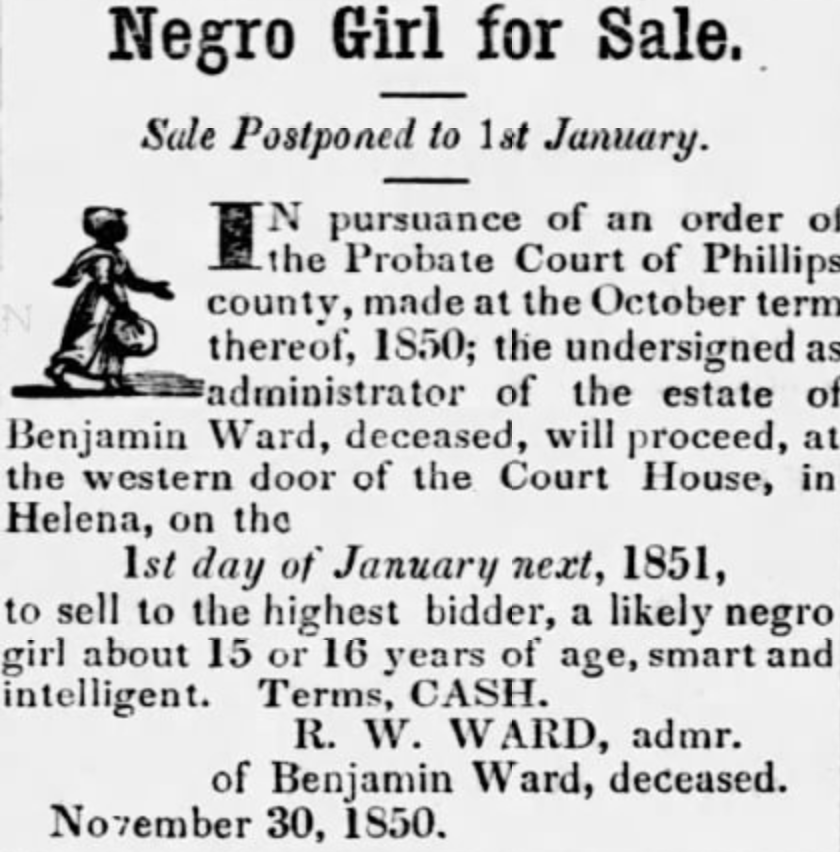
An ad placed in the Southern Shield of Arkansas in 1850, selling a 15- or 16-year-old girl

During the period of legal chattel slavery in the United States, many families were fractured by the selling of individual slaves as chattels (personal property). The experience was a deeply traumatic one—referred to as ambiguous loss—especially for children. Elizabeth, a woman who was sold as a child, said she "grew so lonely and sad I thought I should die, if I did not see my mother".

Some children did not know that their separation would be a permanent one, some only learned later in life, and some were placed into surrogate familial relationships with other enslaved people. Others were reassured by religious promises that they would be reunited, either in life or in Heaven, or that they would be protected by God from the harsh realities of slave life. Even in old age, many slaves continued to think about their lost families; one 86-year-old man named Caleb Craig said "I has visions and dreams of her [his mother], in my sleep, sometime yet".

== Reunification attempts and ads ==
Babies was snatched from their mothers' breasts and sold to speculators. Children was separated from sisters and brothers and never saw each other again. Course they cry; you think they not cry when they was sold like cattle?

— Delia Garlic, an emancipated woman

Both before and after emancipation, some people went to search for their lost families, while others tried to forget their past and create new ones. Moses Roper, for instance, escaped slavery searching for his mother, who he eventually found. Vilet Lester wrote a letter to her former owner, asking to be bought so she could be with her child, and expressing a desire "to [k]now what has Ever become of my Presus little girl"; it is not known whether she ever met with her daughter again. Henry Bibb's wife, Malinda, was still held in bondage when he escaped slavery; though he tried for years to find her again, he remarried and stopped searching.

Following emancipation, many people turned to newspapers to find their loved ones, including newly established African-American newspapers (such as the South Carolina Leader and Free Man's Press) and church periodicals (such as the Christian Recorder and the Star of Zion). The ads included personal information, and expressed a desire to reunite with their lost families; they were placed in special sections of the newspaper, which included titles such as "Information Wanted" or "Lost Friends". Some of the newspapers charged a significant amount of money to place advertisements—for instance, the South Carolina Leader charged $2.50 a month and the Southwestern Christian Advocate had a more elaborate pricing scheme—but most emancipated African Americans were extremely poor.

The ads were common, and they often used the rhetoric of voluntary separation (e.g., "I left them [children] with Sallie Anderson"), even though they were likelier sold to new owners. The Christian Recorder's editor received so many ads that he threatened that the paper "shall be under the necessity of abridging them". In an 1865 issue of the Union Banner, an anonymous writer recognized the ubiquity of the "Information Wanted" ads, and offered religious reassurance to them: "the fate of the loved one" will finally be revealed "one day when time has ceased to be" (in Heaven), since there were countless "nameless graves scattered throughout the land" containing the bodies of lost family members. To increase the spread of the information, many black churches began reading the ads during services. The searches for lost family were complicated by slave name practices: Often, the only names given were first names, which were fluid and changed frequently. Thornton Copeland, for instance, was sold at a young age; an ad, placed 21 years later, asked to reunify with his mother – identified only by the name "Betty".

== Success and cultural legacy ==
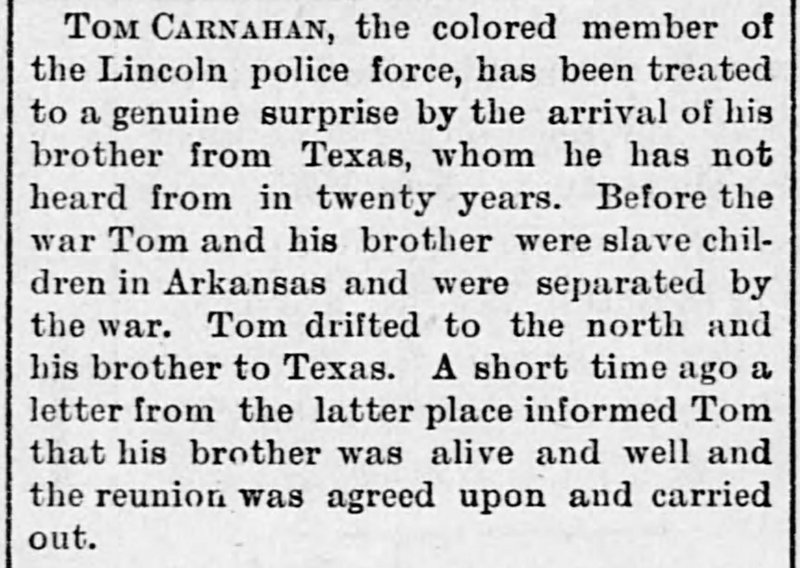
Tom Carnahan (a police officer in Lincoln, Nebraska) and his brother (living in Texas), both formerly enslaved, were reunited in 1884 because of a familial reunification ad.

Attempts at reunification, whether by physical searches or by placing newspaper ads, were largely unsuccessful, and most formerly enslaved persons never reunified with their families. Camps for emancipated African Americans, called freedpeople's camps, were somewhat more successful in reunifying families than ads. Even if family members were reunited by accident, they would sometimes not recognize each other; Henry Brown, a former slave, told a story (possibly fictitious) about a young man, sold in his childhood, who accidentally married his own mother after emancipation. Though rare, familial reunification was an emotional event. Reunified siblings and parents found new meaning in their lives, while reunified spouses occasionally had trouble living together, especially in cases where people remarried and had living spouses. For those who married more than once and had children, sometimes both spouses would claim the children. The ads continued being printed until around 1910 (though at least one ad exists from 1922), and later printings often used the novel phrase "my people".

Moments of reunification have been represented in literature, including Mark Twain's "A True Story, Repeated Word for Word As I Heard It" (1874) and Charles W. Chesnutt's "The Wife of His Youth" (1898). A physical artifact from familial fragmentation survives today: Ashley's Sack, which an enslaved mother (Rose) gave to her daughter (Ashley) before Ashley was sold. Ashley and her mother never saw each other again, and the sack was embroidered by one of Ashley's descendants in 1921; it recounts the story of the gifted sack and the family's inability to reunify.

Since the 1950s, and continuing in the 21st century, the descendants of enslaved African Americans have continued to search for their lost families. The Last Seen project, sponsored by Villanova University and Philadelphia's Methodist Episcopal Church, has digitized hundreds of family reunification ads since its launch in 2016. By early 2017, two families had been reunited because of the project, and as of 2022, around 3500 ads have been digitized. Forums exist online that serve the same purpose as the original "Information Wanted" ads, such as the Unknown No Longer project sponsored by the Virginia Museum of History and Culture. In these forums, posters engage in similar rhetorical practices to reunification ads: They both list all known biographical details of their lost families and request help in finding more information.

== Notes and references ==
=== Bibliography ===
- Cole, Jean Lee (2006). "Information wanted: The Curse of Caste, Minnie's Sacrifice, and the Christian Recorder". African American Review. 40 (4): 731–742. JSTOR 40033749.
- Cooper, Abigail (September 2017). "'Away I goin' to find my mamma': Self-emanicipation, migration, and kinship in refugee camps in the Civil War era". Journal of African American History. 102 (4): 444–467. doi:10.5323/jafriamerhist.102.4.0444. S2CID 148616426.
- Emberton, Carole (Spring 2019). "Searching for Caroline: 'Disciplined imagination' and the limits of the archive". Register of the Kentucky Historical Society. 117 (2): 345–356. doi:10.1353/khs.2019.0051. S2CID 203426367.
- Shapiro, Ari; Pao, Maureen (22 February 2017). "After slavery, searching for loved ones in wanted ads". NPR.
- Shields, Tanya L. (2018). "Collisions: History, home and storytelling". Cultural Dynamics. 30 (1–2): 3–12. doi:10.1177/0921374017751767. S2CID 150224831.
- Titus, Jill Ogline (2 June 2014). "An unfinished struggle: Sesquicentennial interpretations of slavery and emancipation". Journal of the Civil War Era. 4 (2): 338–347. doi:10.1353/cwe.2014.0044. S2CID 144857634.
- Williams, Heather Andrea (2012). Help me to find my people: The African American search for family lost in slavery. University of North Carolina Press. ISBN 9780807835548.
- Wong, Edlie (2006). "'Neither is memory always thus avenging': Longing for kinship in Julia C. Collins' The Curse of Caste and the Christian Recorder". African American Review. 40 (4): 687–704. JSTOR 40033749.
- "About the project". Last Seen.
- "Last Seen: Finding family after slavery". National Archives. 7 June 2021.
- "'Information wanted'". Union Banner. Salisbury, NC. 16 June 1865. p. 2.
