= Post-Tribune =

Post Tribune is a name that refers to various newspapers:

- Post-Tribune (Indiana newspaper)
- Dallas Post Tribune
- Post and Tribune, title of a predecessor of the Detroit Tribune
