= Arkansas State Press =

Defunct newspaper based in Little Rock, Arkansas, United States

- "This paper stands for honesty, justice and fair play. And it stands behind what it stands for."
- Type: Weekly newspaper
- Founder(s): Daisy Bates and L. C. Bates
- Founded: May 9, 1941
- Ceased publication: October 29, 1959
- Relaunched: 1984 - 1987
- Language: English
- Headquarters: West 9th Street
- City: Little Rock, Arkansas
- Country: United States
- OCLC number: 707940147

The Arkansas State Press was an African-American newspaper published from 1941 to 1959. Dubbed "Little Rock's leading African-American newspaper," its owners and editors were Daisy Bates and L. C. Bates. According to historians, the newspaper was "believed by many to be instrumental in bringing about the desegregation of the Little Rock public schools."

== Goals ==
After their move to Little Rock, the Bateses decided to act on a dream of theirs, the ownership of a newspaper. They leased a printing plant that belonged to a church publication, taking over the Twin City Press, and inaugurated their weekly statewide newspaper on May 9, 1941.

The State Press was primarily concerned with advocacy journalism and was modeled off other African-American publications of the era, such as the Chicago Defender and The Crisis. As C. Calvin Smith noted, "the crusading fervor of State Press editorials was clearly demonstrated" by the second issue. Stories about civil rights often ran on the front page with the rest of the paper mainly filled with other stories that spotlighted achievements of black Arkansans. Pictures were also in abundance throughout the paper. L. C. Bates's editorials were fiery, writing that a pastor's sermons were "more offensive than the odor from a cesspool that has been exposed to the sun from the morning of creation down to the present moment" and leading to a $1,500 judgement for libel.

The paper became a voice for civil rights even before a nationally recognized movement had emerged. It covered local and nationwide civil rights news, such as the Emmett Till lynching, which it ran as the lead story, headlined "NAACP Head Says Lynching of Schoolboy Laid[sic] to White Supremacy Drive in Miss." The fire at the Arkansas Negro Boys' Industrial School yielded an image so painful that L. C. Bates destroyed both the print and negative. Daisy Bates was later recognized as co-publisher of the paper.

== Role in school segregation battle ==
As the former president of the Arkansas State Conference of the NAACP, Daisy Bates was involved deeply in desegregated events. Even though in 1954 the United States Supreme Court decision in Brown v. Board of Education made all the segregated schools illegal, the schools in Arkansas refused to enroll African American students. The Bateses editorialized, "We feel that the proper approach would be for the leaders among the Negro race—not clabber mouths, Uncle Toms, or grinning appeasers to get together and counsel with the school heads." Concerning the policy of academic desegregation, The State press cultivated a spirit of immediatism within the hearts of African American and white citizens. Opposite to gradual approach, this newspaper mainly wanted immediate reform in Arkansas' educational system. The State Press reported that the NAACP was the lead organizer in these protest events, and the newspaper also tended to enlarge national influence to let more people get involved in the educational events in Little Rock.

While Governor Orval Faubus and his supporters were refusing even token desegregation of Central High School, this editorial appeared on the front page:

It is the belief of this paper that since the Negro's loyalty to America has forced him to shed blood on foreign battle fields against enemies, to safeguard constitutional rights, he is in no mood to sacrifice these rights for peace and harmony at home.

Throughout its existence, the State Press covered all social news happening within the state. It was a supporter of racial integration in schools and thoroughly publicized its support in its pages. In 1957, Daisy Bates was visited by an unnamed white woman who threatened that unless Bates withdrew her support for integration, "you'll be destroyed — you, your newspaper, your reputation. Everything!". Because of its position during the Little Rock segregation fight, white advertisers, including Southwestern Bell, Arkansas Louisiana Gas, Arkansas Power and Light (now Entergy) held another boycott to punish the newspaper for supporting desegregation. This boycott successfully cut off funding, except the money which came directly and through advertisements from the NAACP national office, and through ads from supporters throughout the country. Despite this the State Press was unable to maintain itself and the last issue was published on October 29, 1959.

== Relaunch ==
Upon her husband's death, Daisy Bates relaunched the State Press in 1984, selling to Janis F. Kearney in 1987, who published it for five more years.

== See also ==
- List of newspapers in Arkansas
- List of African American newspapers in Arkansas
