= Janis F. Kearney =

American author

- Born: September 29, 1953 (age 73); Gould, Arkansas, United States
- Education: Bachelor of Arts in Journalism
- Alma mater: University of Arkansas
- Known for: Personal diarist to President Bill Clinton
- Spouses: Darryl Lunon (m. 1973, divorced); Robert Nash (m. 1994)
- Children: 1
- Website: janisfkearney.com

Janis Faye Kearney (born September 29, 1953) is an American author, lecturer, and publisher. She served as a personal diarist to President Bill Clinton from 1995 to 2001.

== Early life and education ==
Janis F. Kearney was born in Gould, Arkansas to Ethel V. Curry Kearney and Thomas James Kearney; she is the 14th of 19 children. Janis’ father was a sharecropper, and her mother was a homemaker, who spent much of her time, assisting her husband with the family's cotton crops.

From the age of seven, Janis spent her summers chopping cotton, and autumns helping the family pick cotton. By the age of nine, she was also helping care for her younger siblings, and cooking for the family. However, every evening she and her siblings learned reading, writing, and arithmetic at home; they always returned to school in the winter at the top of their classes.

All except one of the Kearney children graduated from college and most went on to graduate school, law school, or both. Many attended some of the top colleges and universities in the country including Harvard, Yale, Brown, Vanderbilt, and Stanford.

After graduating from Gould High School in 1971, Janis attended the University of Arkansas in Fayetteville. She married and had one child during her junior year in college; but she went on to earn a B.A. in journalism in 1976. She continued her education while working, earning thirty hours towards a M.P.A. from the University of Arkansas at Little Rock.

== Professional career ==
Kearney was hired by the State of Arkansas in 1978, where she spent three years as a program manager for the Comprehensive Employment and Training Act program, and another six years as the director of information for the national headquarters of the Migrant Student Records Transfer System.

In 1987, she became the managing editor of the Arkansas State Press newspaper, owned and operated by civil rights activist Daisy Bates. Three months after Janis joined the paper, Bates retired and Kearney bought the company from her. Janis published the weekly newspaper in Arkansas for five years before joining the Clinton-Gore presidential campaign in 1992.

In 1992, when then governor Bill Clinton decided to run for U.S. president, he hired Kearney who he had met during her years with State Government, from her role as publisher of the Arkansas State Press, and as part of the Arkansas Kearney family; to serve as director of his campaign's Minority Media Outreach effort. Governor Clinton had taught several of her brothers during his stint as a professor of law at the University of Arkansas, and later appointed three members of the family to high-level state jobs. Janis took a sabbatical from her newspaper in 1992, and appointed her sister, Janetta Kearney, to run the newspaper during her absence.

== Clinton Administration ==
Following the 1993 election, Kearney worked in the Little Rock office of the Clinton presidential transition. After the president's inauguration, she was one of the Arkansans invited to join the President in Washington, D.C. She worked first as a White House media affairs officer and then as director of public communication for the U.S. Small Business Administration. In 1995 Kearney was appointed to serve as the first-ever personal diarist to a president.

In her role Kearney kept a daily diary of President Clinton's days, attending meetings, events, and press conferences to create a living history. In 1998 she was subpoenaed to testify before a Kenneth Starr grand jury to investigate the Clinton sex scandal. Her diary of the President's days was subpoenaed. No wrongdoing was found. The diary would eventually be passed on to the Clinton Library.

== Journalistic and publishing activities ==
In 2001, Janis moved to Chicago, but began a two-year Fellowship at the Harvard University W. E. B. Du Bois Institute of African and African American Studies, where she began writing her Clinton biography, Conversations: William Jefferson Clinton-From Hope to Harlem.

She continued her research and writing of Conversations as a visiting fellow at DePaul University. In 2003, she was appointed Chancellor's Lecturer for Chicago City Colleges. During that time Janis also wrote a syndicated column, Politics Is Life, which appeared in African-American newspapers throughout the country. Eventually, Conversations was published in 2006, and features interviews with more than 100 African-American acquaintances, and President Clinton.

Kearney began working on her first book, Cotton Field of Dreams, in 1973, which focused on her father's life story. After years of shopping her manuscript at writers’ workshops, she began revising the book to personal memoir, which included vignettes about her father and the rest of the family. She revised the book over the next ten years. Kearney established Writing Our World (WOW) Press in 2004, and published "Cotton Field of Dreams" that same year.

In November 2008, Kearney published her first novel, Once Upon a Time There Was A Girl: A Murder at Mobile Bay. She also published a second memoir, Something to Write Home About: Memories of a Presidential Diarist. She also wrote a biography of her mentor Daisy Gatson Bates in 2013, "Daisy: Between a Rock and a Hard Place," and a book about her father's amazing life journey, "Sundays with TJ: 100 Years of Memories on Varner Road," published in 2014. Janis was inducted into the Arkansas Writers Hall of Fame in 2016, and that same year received the prestigious University of Arkansas Lemke Journalism Award. In 2014, Janis with the help of a small group of Arkansas women, founded the Celebrate! Maya Project, a nonprofit whose mission is to share Maya Angelou's life and legacy with schools and communities, and to create and implement arts, literacy and poetry programs for youth around the state. In 2015, she founded the Read.Write.Share Writers Weekend, in response to new and emerging writers' need to interact with other writers and to share their stories with others.
