= Baxter, Arkansas =

Unincorporated community in Arkansas, United States

- Unincorporated community
- Location within Arkansas Location within the United States
- Coordinates: 33°31′45″N 91°30′00″W
- Country: United States
- State: Arkansas
- County: Drew
- Elevation: 121 ft (37 m)
- Time zone: UTC-6 (Central (CST))
  - Summer (DST): UTC-5 (CDT)
- ZIP: 71638
- Area code: 870
- GNIS feature ID: 76248

Baxter is an unincorporated community in Drew County, Arkansas, United States. It is located on Arkansas Highway 35 west of Dermott, near where the highway crosses Bayou Bartholomew. Located 40 mi (64 km) from the bayou mouth, it traditionally marked the head of navigation on the bayou.

The settlement started as a former plantation named Bartholomew and was renamed Baxter during the Brooks–Baxter War. In 1880, the population was approximately 600 whites and 2000 blacks.

The Baxter Vidette, an African-American newspaper, began publishing in Baxter in 1902.
