= Family separation in American slavery =

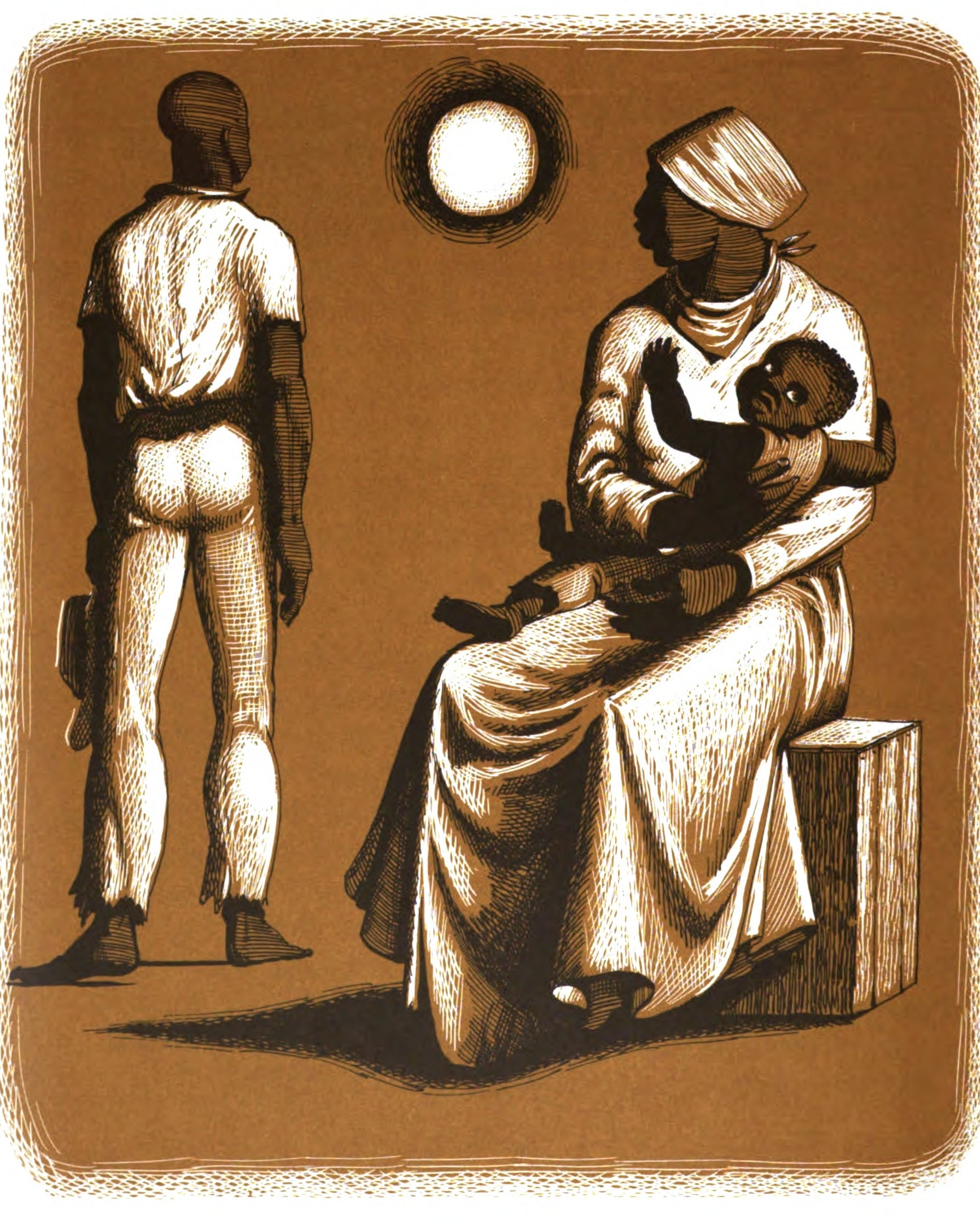
Illustration by Leonard Everett Fisher

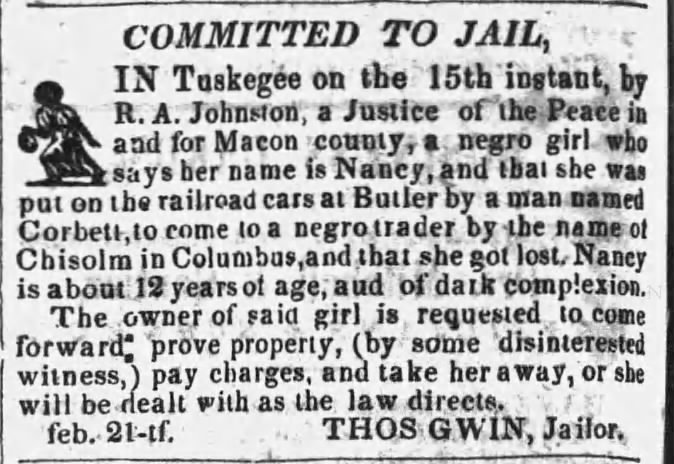
"Committed to Jail" Tuskegee Republican, Tuskegee, Alabama, February 21, 1856

Family separation in American slavery was extremely common. According to one historian of the slave trade in the United States, "The magnitude of the trade, in terms of the lives it affected and families it destroyed, is without a doubt greater than any Civil War battlefield." There is widespread evidence of the pervasive nature of family separation: "A central feature of virtually every slave autobiography and of many of the slave interviews, for example, is the trauma caused slaves by forced family separation." A study of 1200 runaway slave ads placed in Tennessee newspapers found that about a quarter of them mentioned the whereabouts of a slave's family members or included location information about their previous home, meaning that "slaveholders were acutely aware of how much distress they caused by moving slaves away from their families." An associated analysis of 700 slave sale advertisements placed in Tennessee found only five percent of such ads showed evidence of an attempt to keep family members together.

Historian Calvin Schermerhorn wrote of Franklin & Armfield, entrepreneurs of the 1820s and 1830s, "As it innovated in finance and transportation, Franklin and Armfield became an engine of family wreckage and social disruption. What one contemporary critic called 'the Slave-Factory of Franklin & Armfield' produced captives by disarticulating families." The motivation for this family separation was market forces; Theophilus Freeman wrote to other traders in his network in 1839: "I want you to buy nothing but No. 1 [prime-age] negroes, as you will find plenty of them for sale before you can get money. Don't pay out a dollar for an old negro, unless you can get it very low, nor don't buy families, as there is not a single man here to buy such." In 1979, economist Laurence Kotlikoff analyzed a set of New Orleans slave sale prices from the period 1804 to 1862 and concluded "There is no evidence that slave owners valued the integrity of the entire slave family, although some evidence that they valued particular relationships within the family." Lewis Hayden wrote about the Presbyterian minister who owned him when he was a child, "It was commonly reported that my master had said in the pulpit that there was no more harm in separating a family of slaves than a litter of pigs. I did not hear him say it, and so cannot say whether this is true or not."

The death from cholera of Harriet Beecher Stowe's toddler in 1849 was one of the reasons she began writing about slavery; her grief at his death connected her to enslaved mothers who were irrevocably separated from their children by slave traders. Henry Watson recorded losing his mother in his 1848 slave narrative: "The old slave-woman who took care of me during my sickness, by way of consolation, gave me as much information as she could about my mother's being taken away. She told me that a slave-dealer drove to the door in a buggy, and my mother was sent for to come into the house; when, getting inside, she was knocked down, tied, and thrown into the buggy, and carried away. As the old woman related these things to me, I felt as if all hope was gone; that I was forsaken and alone in this world." Another survivor of American slavery told the WPA Slave Narratives project, "If you want to know what unhappiness means, just stand on the slave block and hear the auctioneer's voice selling you away from the folks you love."

== See also ==
- Family reunification ads after emancipation
- List of American slave traders
- Suicide, infanticide, and self-mutilation by slaves in the United States
