= Arkansas Freeman =

Defunct African American newspaper in Arkansas

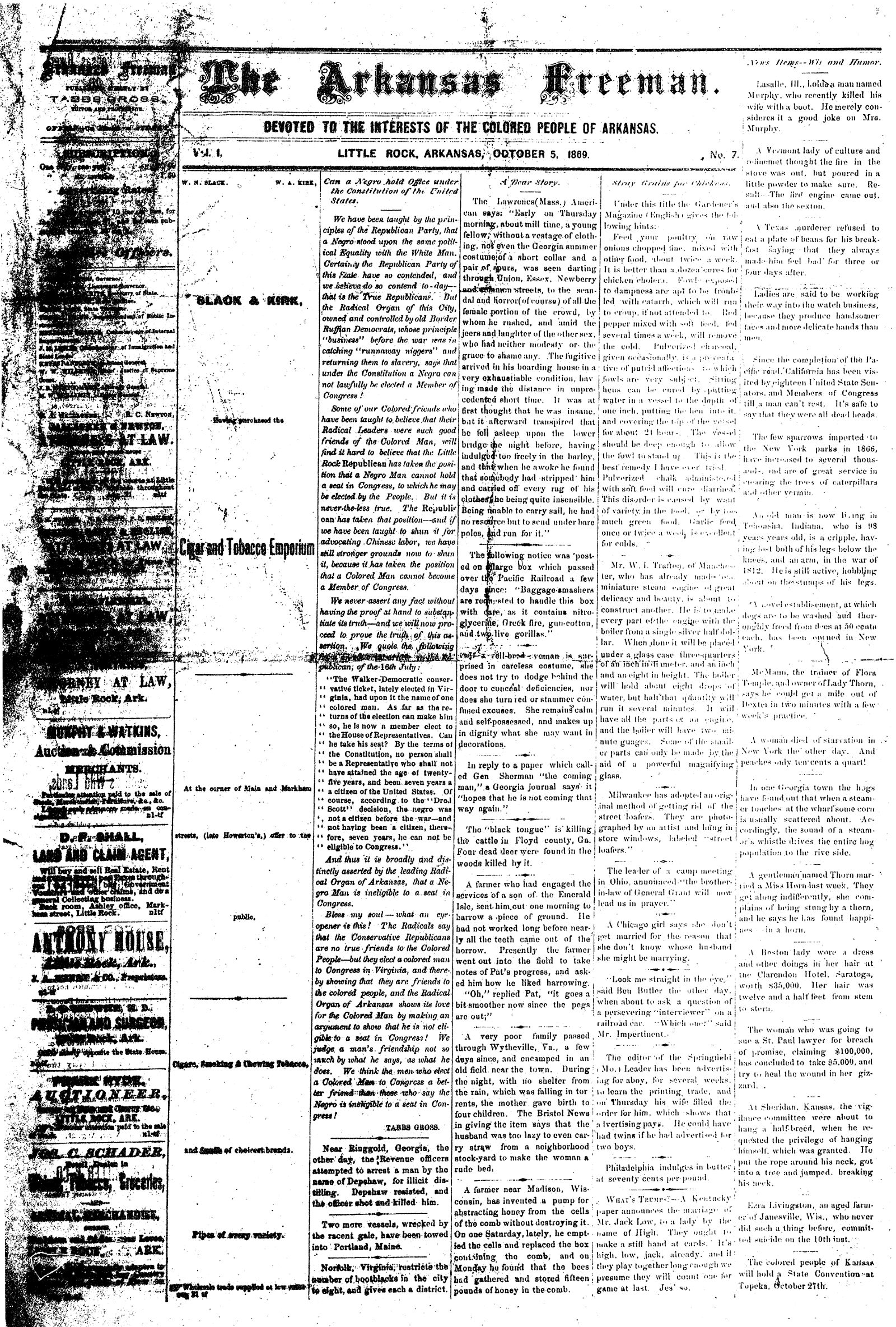
Front page of the 5 October 1869 issue of the Arkansas Freeman

The Arkansas Freeman was the first African American newspaper in Arkansas. It was founded in 1869 and went defunct in 1870. The paper was opposed to the Radical Republican rule of Arkansas, and opposed the reality that black Arkansans mostly supported them. While its editor intended to reopen the paper in 1871, the paper was never published again.

== Foundation ==
In June 1869, several prominent black men in Arkansas met to consider establishing the first black newspaper in the state. They announced a formal dinner and meeting for the latter half of the month, and some of the white press—including the Arkansas Gazette—found it important. The announcement was held in the wake of the Civil War and during the Reconstruction era; the Gazette reported that the foundation of a black press was nearly as important as emancipation for the establishment of black civic life. However, they warned that Radical Republicans—some of the earliest supporters of a black newspaper bid—did not care about black Arkansans, and they desired a newspaper that was "independent and patriotic". The Gazette wrote to Arkansas Democrats that a black newspaper was politically advantageous for them, while the Morning Republican supported its establishment.

In July, Tabbs Gross—the planned editor of the paper who was a reverend, former slave, and recent transplant to Arkansas—began distributing material to other newspapers in the state, explaining his reasons for establishing a newspaper, and what its aims were. Gross advocated for what he called "Republican Freedom": The right to vote without regard to race, the right to practice private religion, the ability to self-advocate, and the establishment of separate schools and churches for black people. This Republican Freedom was similar to what conservative Democrats desired, and Radical Republicans withdrew much of their support for the paper's establishment as a result. (Note: The Gazette wrote that this withdrawal of support was because Radical Republicans could no longer control black people.) Many members of Arkansas's black community also withdrew their support, but some—including a community in Little Rock—continued to support Gross. One group of black Republicans in Little Rock said Gross had become "an imposter and an enemy to his race".

== Publication ==
The first issue of the Arkansas Freeman—the first African American newspaper in Arkansas—was published on 21 August 1869 in Little Rock. It was probably made of four pages, and throughout its life, the paper's motto was "Devoted to the interests of the colored persons of Arkansas". The paper was financially supported by advertisements and Gross.

The paper opposed the Radical Republicans: It attacked black people who supported the Radicals as being a "flock of sheep"; printed an unpublished (and perhaps fake) attack article by a writer of the Republican, which said of Gross, "for if we don't get rid of him in some way he'll have half of the best paying offices in the state filled with niggers, in less time than two years"; and supported black people being elected to political office, which local Radicals thought was unconstitutional at the federal level. It bemoaned the political landscape of Arkansas, in which black people held around 10 of 200 offices in one county. It opposed the existence of slavery, both within the United States and abroad. It supported equality before the law—including universal male suffrage—and the paper published stories saying that many white people were deprived of civil rights in the South. The paper endorsed several black candidates who ran as Republicans in the 1869 Little Rock municipal election, most of whom won.

== Demise ==
In December 1869, Gross closed the paper during his travel, and in March 1870, he reopened it. During the closure, J.C. Akers, a journalist from Ohio, claimed that Gross had sold him the paper for $180 and promissory notes, but he withdrew from the deal because the paper was unprofitable. Gross sued Akers as a result. While it is not known exactly when the paper went defunct, Gross said later that it stopped publishing new articles during the summer of 1870.

He intended to reopen the paper again in 1871. He never did.

== Notes and references ==
=== Bibliography ===
- Dillard, Tom (1974). "To the back of the elephant: Racial conflict in the Arkansas Republican Party". Arkansas Historical Quarterly. 33 (1): 3–15. ISSN 0004-1823.
- Littlefield, Daniel F.; McGraw, Patricia Washington (1979). "The Arkansas Freeman, 1869-1870: Birth of the black press in Arkansas". Phylon. 40 (1): 75–85. doi:10.2307/274424. ISSN 0031-8906.
- Lovett, Bobby L. (1995). "African Americans, Civil War, and aftermath in Arkansas". Arkansas Historical Quarterly. 54 (3): 304–358. ISSN 0004-1823.
- Neal, Diane (1989). "Seduction, accommodation, or realism? Tabbs Gross and the Arkansas Freeman". Arkansas Historical Quarterly. 48 (1): 57–64. doi:10.2307/40027806. ISSN 0004-1823.
- Pruden, William H. III (2020). "Tabbs Gross (1820–1880)". Encyclopedia of Arkansas. Central Arkansas Library System.
