= People's World =

American Marxist national online news publication

- We take sides...yours!
- Type: Daily newspaper
- Publisher: Longview Publishing Inc.
- Editor-in-chief: John Wojcik
- Managing editor: C. J. Atkins
- News editor: Chauncey K. Robinson
- Founded: 1924 (as the Daily Worker); 1938 (as People's World)
- Language: English, Spanish
- Headquarters: Chicago, Illinois
- Country: United States
- Website: www.peoplesworld.org

People's World, official successor to the Daily Worker, is a progressive, socialist, and Marxist-Leninist national daily online news publication. Founded by activists, socialists, communists, and those active in the labor movement in the early 1900s, the current publication is a result of a merger between the Daily World, and the West Coast weekly paper People's Daily World in 1987.

== History ==
People's World traces its lineage to the Daily Worker newspaper, founded by communists, socialists, union members, and other activists in Chicago in 1924. On the front page of its first edition, the paper declared that "big business interests, bankers, merchant princes, landlords, and other profiteers" should fear the Daily Worker. It pledged to "raise the standards of struggle against the few who rob and plunder the many".

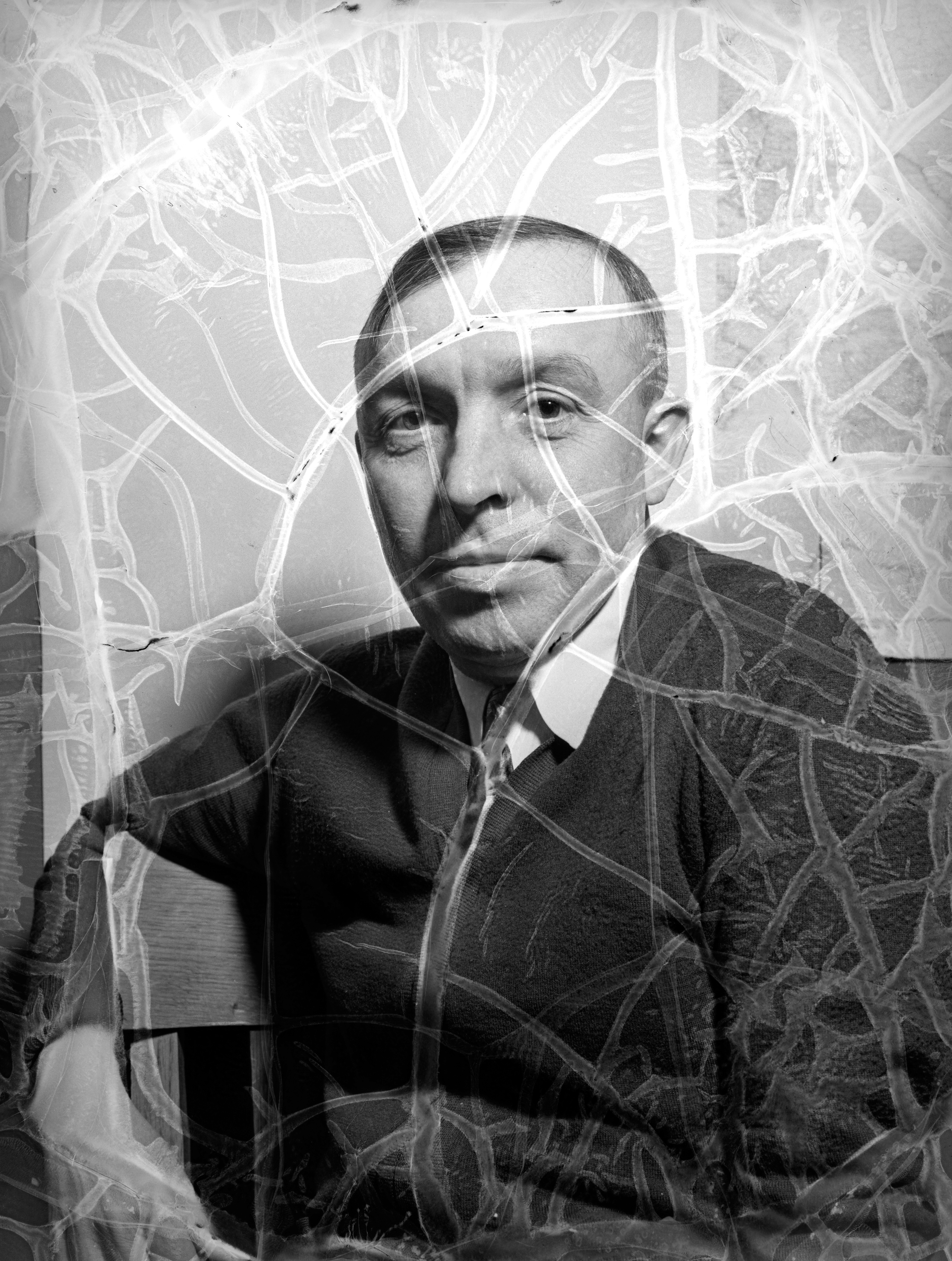
Harrison George, the paper's inaugural editor-in-chief, c. 1937

People's Daily World was first launched in 1938. Its founder, Harrison George, started People's Daily World in San Francisco after he raised $33,000 from supporters in California. The paper had 20,000 readers and cost 3 cents. The paper circulated throughout the West Coast. It was completely funded through subscribers.

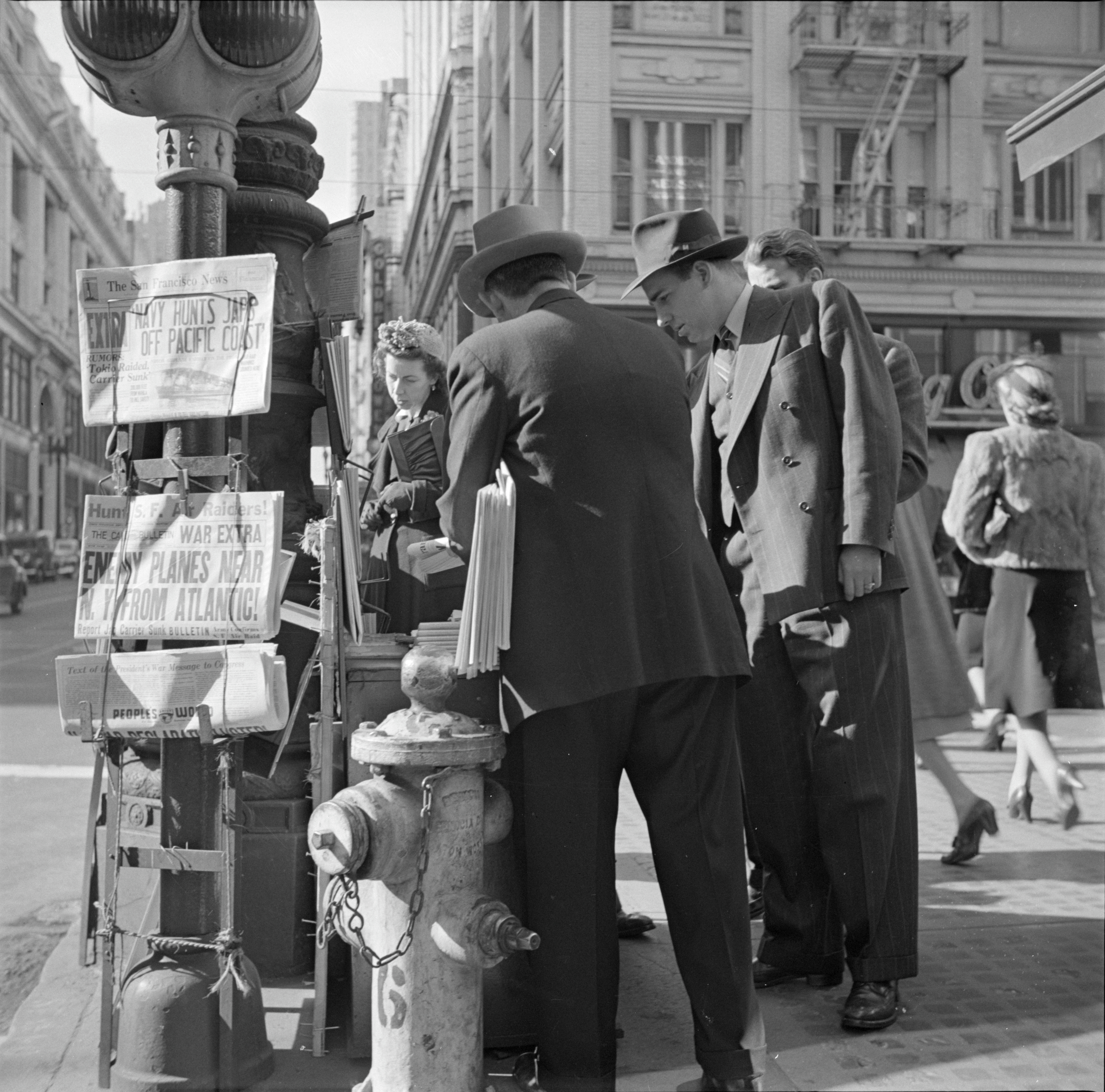
People's World on the newsstands in San Francisco after the attack on Pearl Harbor, December 8, 1941

After World War II, many of the editors of People's Daily World were convicted using the Smith Act of "conspiring to violently overthrow the U.S. government". During the 1950s, reporters from the paper were not allowed in the press galleries of various California governing bodies. Circulation was also down in the 1950s, with the paper only having a press run of 5,000 in 1955. In 1957, the paper became a weekly publication.

People's World also has a Spanish language section called Mundo Popular.

In 2009, People's World was re-launched as an online news publication where it continues to publish news on a daily basis.

People's World continues a limited weekly print edition as of 2025. These print editions are sent to individuals held in prison systems in 14 different states across the United States. People's World also produces multiple state and local print editions.

== About ==
On January 1, 2010, People's World became an online-only publication under a Creative Commons license.

== Notable reporters and writers ==
Notable reporters, columnists, and contributors
Name	Title	Notes
Woody Guthrie	Singer and songwriter	Early columnist, writing 253 articles, most during 1939
Ollie Harrington	Cartoonist	
Alice Greenfield McGrath	Reporter	
Ella Reeve Bloor	Reporter	Early columnist
Michael Parenti	Author and lecturer	
Angela Davis	Activist, philosopher, academic, and author	
Victor Grossman	Publicist and author	More well known for his defection from the U.S. Army to the GDR in 1952
Akwasi Evans	Journalist and activist	
