= Akwasi Evans =

African-American journalist and activist

Askwasi Roselle Evans
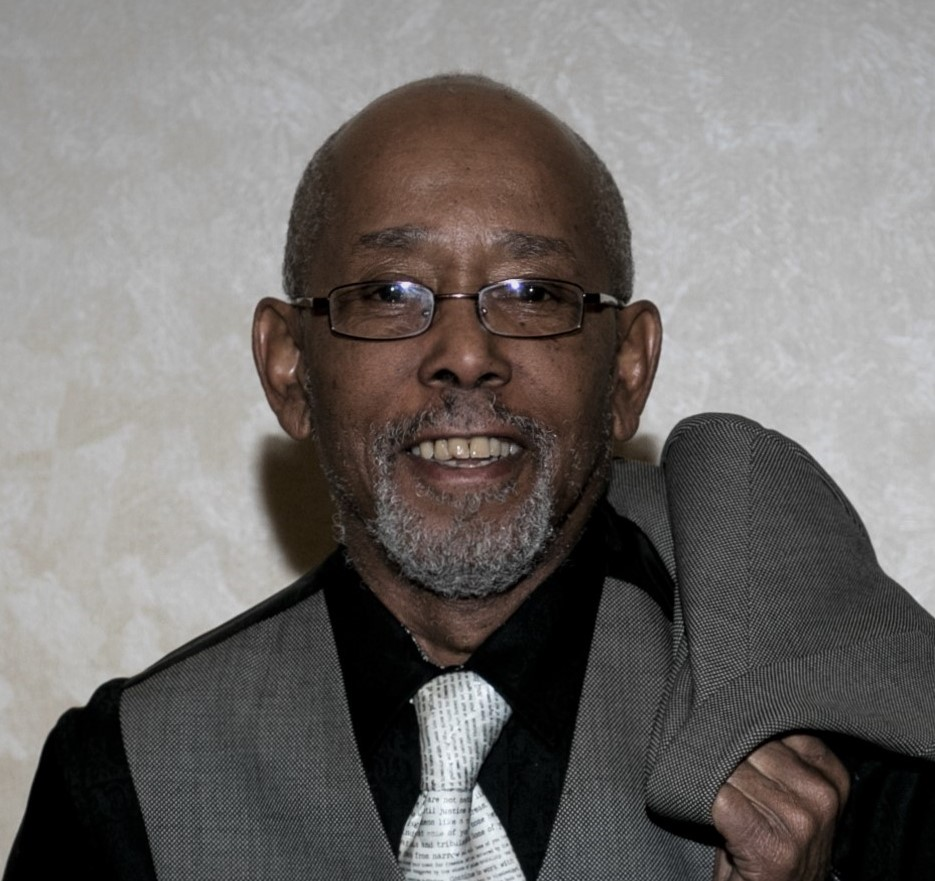
- Born: Larry Elvis Dale; October 17, 1948; Dayton, Ohio, U.S.
- Died: April 8, 2019 (aged 70); Austin, Texas, U.S.
- Education: Texas State University
- Occupations: Journalist and publisher
- Known for: Publisher of NOKOA: Observer

Akwasi Rozelle Evans (October 17, 1948 – April 8, 2019) was an African-American journalist, a prominent Austin civil-rights activist, and the founder of the NOKOA Observer newspaper. Evans edited and published the progressive weekly newspaper for 32 years, to provide a voice for Austin activists, free of distortion by mainstream media. His civil-rights activism included a broad range of causes and was not limited to issues of race.

== Personal life ==
Evans was born Larry Elvis Dale in Dayton, Ohio. He grew up in Kentucky, attending an all-black school before desegregation. He relocated from Lexington to Austin in 1980s, became involved in civil-rights activism and changed his name to Akwasi Rozelle Evans.

As a father, Akwasi encouraged his daughter Sherilyn Scott-Blackburn to pursue her love of singing. She performed under her stage name, Sheri Mogul, at his memorial in Austin on June 16, 2019.

Evans was a member of the Alpha Phi Alpha fraternity.

== Journalist ==
Evans became a beat reporter for The Villager newspaper. Through his contributions, Evans became a crucial part of East Austin's political progressive infrastructure. Tommy Wyatt, editor of The Villager newspaper called Evans "a tireless warrior for East Austin, who would spare nothing" in support of his community. Evans also wrote for the Austin American Statesman for a year and worked as a freelance reporter for the Daily World in the 1970s and 1980s. Evans briefly supported the Communists because he admired them for standing up for The Scottsboro Boys, the African American teenagers, falsely accused of rape in 1931. However, when he saw the racism within the party he realized communism was a failed system and withdrew his support.

== Civil-rights activist ==
Evans participated in a march during Freedom Summer and saw Martin Luther King, Jr. This had a strong effect on him and he was inspired to become an activist. In Austin Evans led the Austin anti-apartheid movement and also worked on a broad range of civil-rights movements, including CISPES on Central America, the Lebanon movement, and ADAPT, the disability rights organization. He was leading organizer of the first MLK Jr. marchers in Austin. Other civil-rights causes Evans supported included NARAL and TARAL. In 1995 Evans participated in the Million Man March in Washington, D.C., with Tommy Wyatt, founder of Austin's The Villager newspaper. During his last decade Evans opposed the gentrification of East Austin.

== NOKOA: The Observer ==
Evans left The Villager in August 1987 and started his own newspaper, NOKOA: The Observer. He felt that the mainstream media distorted what activists did. He also saw that the black media wouldn't cover activists' work. He believed that the community of activists in Austin did not have a voice, and he was determined to create a progressive paper to serve these activists who fought for civil rights, justice, and opposed discrimination. He also wanted the paper to be an Afrocentric Newspaper, and not simply a black newspaper. He published and edited the progressive weekly newspaper until his death.

NOKOA: The Observer covered police misconduct and community empowerment. It provided a place for social justice in local Austin media. The paper gave a voice to Central Texas' political activists who were challenging the laws and customs that oppressed people because of "their skin color, religion, sexual choice, gender identity, age, size or income," said Nelson Linder, the president of the Austin chapter of the NAACP.

Evans was a member of the Texas Publishers Association and the National Newspaper Publishers Association (NNPA). For 32 years the NOKOA: The Observer provided the Austin community with valuable information and public service announcements.

== Radio show ==
After returning from the Million Man March in 1995, Evans and Tommy Wyatt teamed-up with co-host Damita Shanklin, to form "The Breakfast Club" on KAZI 88.7 FM radio. The conversational show aired Friday morning at 8 am and the hosts shared different points of view on issues, not always agreeing, but never falling out over their differences.

== Editorial on Zimmerman decision ==
Evans wrote an editorial, "A 21st Century Dred Scott Decision" in response to George Zimmerman being found not guilty of second-degree murder in the death of Trayvon Martin. In July 2013, the Texas Observer published his editorial. In it Evans decried the decision in the Zimmerman case and compared it to the 1857 Dred Scott Decision, which held that the constitution was not meant to include citizenship for black people.
