= L. C. Bates =

American journalist and activist

- Born: Lucius Christopher Bates; April 27, 1904; Liberty, Mississippi, U.S.
- Died: August 22, 1980 (aged 76); Little Rock, Arkansas, U.S.
- Occupations: Journalist; civil rights activist
- Spouses: Kassandra Crawford (m. 1924; div. 1930); Daisy Bates (m. 1942)

Lucius Christopher Bates (April 27, 1904 – August 22, 1980) was an African-American civil rights activist and the husband of Daisy Bates.

He founded the Arkansas State Press newspaper with his wife in 1941. He was an active member of the NAACP and was one of the plaintiffs in the Supreme Court case Cooper v. Aaron, which was filed by the NAACP so the decision made by the court in the Brown v. Board of Education case would be properly enforced.

== Early life ==
Lucious Christopher Bates was born April 27, 1904, in Liberty, Mississippi, to Laura and Morris Bates, the latter of whom was a farmer, carpenter, and minister. The Bates family were some of the few blacks in the area. Due to the position Rev. Morris Bates held in the community and the respect the residents had for him, Bates was allowed to attend but not enroll into the local white school. The family would later move to Indianola, Mississippi where Bates was enrolled into a black public school. Bates would finish high school at Alcorn Agricultural and Mechanical College, which was not uncommon at that time.

After high school, Bates would study journalism at Alcorn A&M College in Mississippi and Wilberforce University in Ohio for a year before dropping out.

Bates worked a series of newspaper jobs after dropping out of college. He later changed careers and worked as a traveling salesman, selling insurance and novelty advertising. Bates moved to Omaha, Nebraska where he would meet his first wife, Kassandra Crawford. The young couple would marry in 1924 then relocate to Memphis, Tennessee. They had one daughter together - Loretta Ann Bates Carter. By the time they had split in 1930, Bates had already met his second wife - Daisy Lee Gatson. Gatson was fifteen at the time of their meeting. They would reunite a few years later when she was 17 and begin dating. Bates and Gatson would marry March 4, 1942 in Fordyce, Arkansas. Afterwards, they moved to Little Rock.

== Arkansas State Press ==
After moving to Little Rock, Bates retained a love for journalism. If he worked in a journalistic job, he would not have the freedom to fight political and socio-economic injustices. He reasoned, "If I owned the paper, I wouldn't lose my job." In 1941, Bates and his wife would use their savings to purchase the black operated Twin City Press, later renamed Arkansas State Press. The State Press advocated for civil rights and covered black involvement in sports, social events, politics and entertainment. In addition, the State Press talked about police brutality the harsh treatment of black citizens, attacking racial injustice. The first issue was released May 9, 1941 with the motto: "This paper stands for honesty, justice and fair play. And it stands behind what it stands for." In the second issue, the State Press addressed the lack of employment opportunities for black residents in Arkansas as well as the nation. During this time, Europe was caught in World War II. The United States was not involved yet, but the countries defense was being developed. When defense industries started locating to Arkansas, blacks were denied employment. This prompted Bates to write a response in the State Press, telling the federal government they should use blacks in the national defense program as safeguards against saboteurs and fifth columnists. "Place Negroes as guards on munitions factories, shipyards, airplane works...This is no time to quibble with stupid prejudice, our national defense is more important than unreasonable racial antagonisms."

For eighteen years the newspaper was an influence in the civil rights movement in Arkansas. The newspaper would eventually close in 1959.

== Activism ==
Outside of producing the State Press, Bates was active in Little Rock's NAACP Arkansas branch and served as head of the Legal Redress Committee in 1950.
