= Delia Garlic =

Formerly enslaved woman

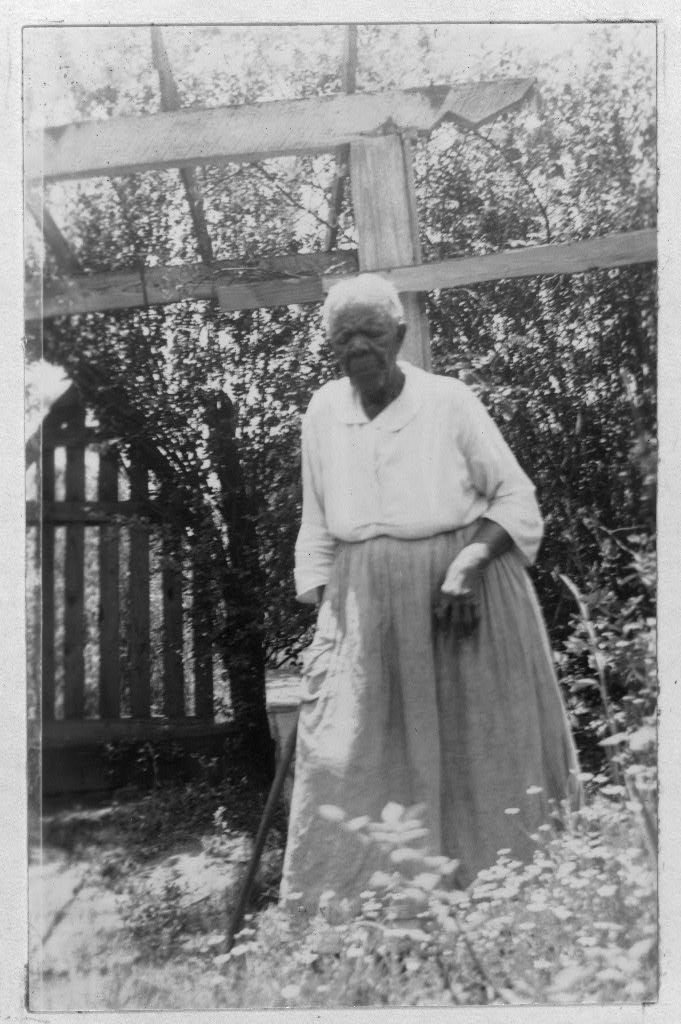
Delia Garlic, age 100

Delia Garlic (c. 1837 – ?) was a formerly enslaved woman originally from Virginia. Garlic is best known for her first-hand account of slavery, the Civil War, and post-emancipation freedom. In 1937 when she was one hundred years old, the Federal Writers' Project of The Works Project Administration recorded her oral history, in Montgomery, Alabama. During this testimony, she offered first-person testimony of the horrors of the slave trade, "when babies were snatched from their mothers breasts," and of being sold six times before emancipation.

== The Federal Writers' Project ==
Between 1936 and 1938, The Works Project Administration (WPA) sent writers across the country to interview ordinary people about their experiences and life histories. Delia Garlic was interviewed by Margaret Fowler for the FWP, and her interview was one of hundreds that took place over the course of this project.

Garlic's interview was noted as significant because of her firsthand depiction of life under enslavement. Her account is still considered to be "one of the most critical recorded during the FWP project."

== Biography ==
At the time of the 1937 interview, Garlic was one-hundred years old, but she was able to recount many of her experiences from her early life as an enslaved woman. Garlic was born in 1837 as the youngest of thirteen children to an enslaved woman in Powhatan, Virginia. Garlic was taken by slave speculators as an infant, and she did not know eleven of her thirteen siblings or her father. She, along with her mother and brother William, were then taken to an auction in Richmond, Virginia, where they were sold to their enslaver, a Henrico County sheriff named Carter. In this purchase, Garlic was kept with her mother, but she was separated from her brother, whom she would never see or contact again.

Garlic was responsible for taking care of Carter's granddaughter during her early years. At one point in the FWP interview, she recalls a time when the child hurt her hand, and in turn, the child's mother chose to "pick up a hot iron and run it all down [Garlic's] arm and hand." This abuse continued even after Carter remarried, with several physical lashings resulting from Garlic's makeup choices. In one particular case, Carter's new wife found Garlic's eyebrow makeup to be too similar to her own. As a result, she yelled at Garlic, stating "You black devil, I'll show you how to mock your betters" and physically assaulted her by hitting her head with a piece of firewood.

Following years of abuse at the hands of Carter and his wives, Garlic attempted to escape her enslaver after a specific instance where he threatened to have an overseer beat her in approximately 1860. Despite this effort, she ultimately returned to her enslaver, and she was taken to the auction again.

After being taken away from Carter and to the auction, it was clear to Garlic that this would likely be the last time that she would ever see her mother. At the age of one hundred, Garlic still remembered the last words that her mother spoke to her. In the FWP interview, she stated that her mother told her to "Be good an' trus' in de Lawd." She also goes on to explain that this trust in God was one of the only pieces of hope that enslaved individuals could hold onto. "Trustin' was de only hope of de pore black critters in dem days. Us jest prayed for strength to endure it to de end. We didn't 'spect nothin' but to stay in bondage till we died."

Garlic was sold to several individuals after this incident, including a Georgia hotelier, a businessman, and finally a planter named Garlic in Louisiana. During her time on Garlic's farm, Delia Garlic said she "didn't know nothin' 'cept to work." Garlic would work from the early hours of the morning, often starting her day around 3 to 4 a.m. Despite working long hours for her enslaver, she and the other enslaved peoples on the plantation were left without any food resources for cooking in their cabins.

Garlic married a man from another plantation named Chatfield in the years leading up to the Civil War, but she never saw him again after he was forced into service for the Confederates in 1861. She later married a man by the name of Miles Garlic, with whom she had at least two children.

== Legacy ==
Even in the times of the Great Depression, Garlic's life improved in the post-emancipation world. Garlic is known to have said that she was "eatin' white bread now an' havin' de best time of [her] life."

Garlic's account provided insight into what life was like for enslaved individuals and their families, as well as the lasting effects of enslavement even after emancipation had been granted.
