= Bobby Lovett =

American historian

- Born: Memphis, Tennessee, U.S.
- Education: University of Arkansas
- Occupation: Historian

Bobby L. Lovett was an American historian. He is an emeritus professor of history at Tennessee State University, where he served as the dean of the College of Arts and Sciences from 1999 to 2009. He is the author of several books about African-American history.

He has written editorials including about the legacy of slavery and Andrew Jackson.

== Selected works ==
- From Winter to Winter : the Afro-American history of Nashville, Tennessee, 1870-1930 Tennessee State University (1981)
- Lovett, Bobby (1999). The African American History of Nashville, 1780-1930: Elites and Dilemmas. Fayetteville, Arkansas: University of Arkansas Press. ISBN 9781557285553. OCLC 468529280.
- Lovett, Bobby (2005). The Civil Rights Movement in Tennessee: A Narrative History. Knoxville, Tennessee: University of Tennessee Press. ISBN 9781621902294. OCLC 972039181.
- Lovett, Bobby (2007). How It Came To Be: The Boyd Family's Contribution over the Past 100 Years to African American Religious Publishing, 1896--present. Lavergne, Tennessee: Lightning Source Press. ISBN 9781589423152. OCLC 123414689.
- Lovett, Bobby (2012). A Touch of Greatness: A History of Tennessee State University. Macon, Georgia: Mercer University Press. ISBN 9780881464351. OCLC 828893347.
- Lovett, Bobby (2015). America's Historically Black Colleges & Universities: A Narrative History, 1837–2009. Macon, Georgia: Mercer University Press. ISBN 9780881465341. OCLC 917131576.
