= Freeman's Press =

Defunct African American newspaper in Texas

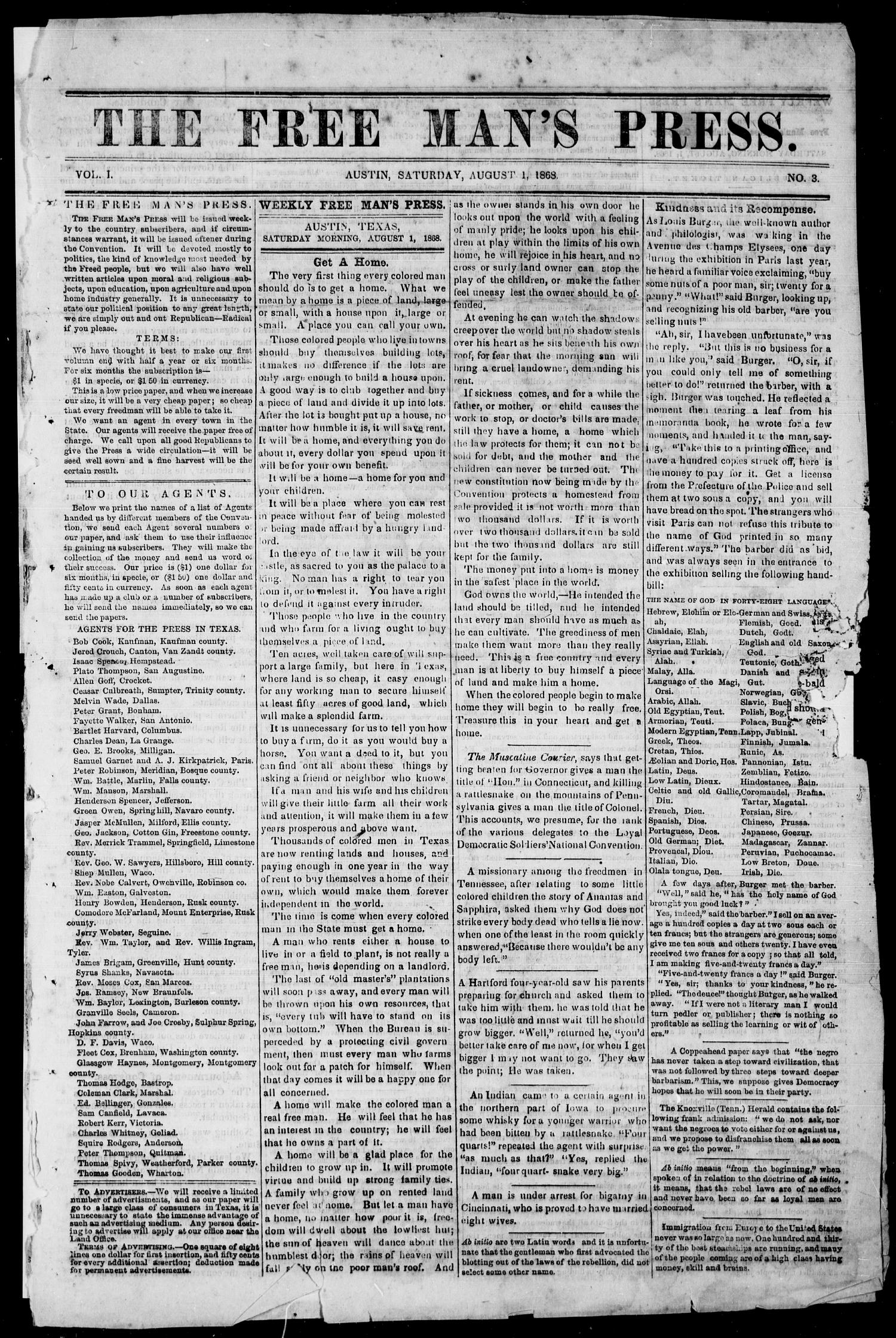
Front cover of the Freeman's Press on August 1, 1868

The Freeman's Press or Free Man's Press was the first African American newspaper in Texas. Established by a white carpetbagger journalist named James Pearson Newcomb in Austin, the newspaper had an African American editor and several black journalists working for it. Due to high costs, it opened in July 1868 and closed that October.

== Background ==
Preceding the American Civil War, there were no African American newspapers published in Texas since around 95% of the black population—many of them enslaved—were unable to read or write. Black illiteracy was a legally-enforced prohibition by Texas, though following the Civil War, many of these racist regulations were lifted and black literacy rates improved considerably. As a result, many freedpeople began to desire a journalistic press that represented their own communities; the Freeman's Press was the first of these, and it was financially supported by white carpetbagger journalist James Pearson Newcomb and the Union League.

Newcomb, alongside many others (including some African American journalists), established the underlying corporation in Austin, Texas, in July 1868. Melvin C. Keith, a black journalist, (Note: One scholar says Keith was white, and one gives his first name as Melving.) was designated as the editor of the paper.

== Publication ==
The Freeman's Press debuted on July 18, 1868, a short period before that year's elections. In its inaugural issue, the paper established itself as a political paper that supported the Radical Republican cause. Several of its writers were African Americans, but Newcomb exerted significant control over the paper and its political orientation. Among the topics addressed by the paper was the contemporary civil rights movement, the forty acres and a mule proposal, the uplifting of black civic and spiritual life (as opposed to Native Americans, which the paper wrote were "savages" as opposed to "civilized Christian men"), and the 1868 Republican National Convention. It argued against the creation of secret organizations to combat white supremacy and the Ku Klux Klan, and it denounced the racist idea that black people were staging a "Negro insurrection". George Ruby, a black politician and journalist, wrote in the paper, and it serialized a series of lectures by politician Clinton B. Fisk entitled "Plain Counsels for Freedmen: In Sixteen Brief Lectures". At some point, it was renamed the Free Man's Press.

Production costs were high for the paper, many of its journalists were not adequately paid, and Keith asked subscribers to pay him directly—not the paper—due to fear of confiscation by postal workers. On September 19, the paper moved from Austin to Galveston. On October 24, 1868, after Keith stated he was leaving the paper, its last issue was published and the paper dissolved. The Freeman's Press was succeeded by the Galveston Spectator in 1873, the first Texan paper owned and published by African Americans.

== Notes and references ==
=== Bibliography ===
- Dickerson, Donna L. (1998). "George T. Ruby: Reconstruction politician/journalist". American Journalism. 15 (1): 51–68. doi:10.1080/08821127.1998.10731959.
- Gourgey, Hannah (2001). "Poetics of memory and marginality: Images of the Native American in African-American newspapers, 1870–1900 and 1970–1990". In Vogel, Todd (ed.). The black press: New literary and historical essays. Rutgers University Press. ISBN 0813530040.
- Kinshasa, Kwando Mbiassi (2006). Black resistance to the Ku Klux Klan in the wake of the Civil War. McFarland & Company. ISBN 9780786424672.
- Litwack, Leon F. (1979). Been in the storm so long: The aftermath of slavery. Alfred A. Knopf.
- Smallwood, James (1983). "Texas". In Suggs, Henry Lewis (ed.). The black press in the South, 1865–1979. Contributions in Afro-American and African studies. Greenwood Press. ISBN 9780313222443.
