= The Villager (Austin, Texas) =

- Type: Weekly newspaper
- Format: Broadsheet
- Founder: Tommie Lee Wyatt
- Publisher: Black Registry Publishing Company
- Editor: Thomas Wyatt
- Founded: 1973
- Headquarters: 4132 E. 12th Street; Austin, TX 78721; United States
- Circulation: 6,000
- Website: www.theaustinvillager.com

The Villager is a free weekly newspaper published in Austin, Texas, serving the African-American community. The paper covers issues of local interest and also national and international stories.

The Villager is the longest-running Black community newspaper in Austin. Rooted in advocacy, positivity and service, the paper has had a strong focus on community issues. The paper's influence has grown over time and politicians regularly seek the paper's endorsement.

It is the policy of The Villager to serve consumers and merchants in the Austin market, focusing on news, events, announcements and news-makers, with an emphasis on African-Americans of all ages and occupations.

A unique section of the paper is "The Youth Brigade", which includes articles submitted by students from area schools. Students earn a stipend for their submission of articles about their school or community.

== Founder Tommie Lee Wyatt ==
The Villager grew from the Black Registry which Tommie Lee "T.L." Wyatt' started in 1970. As Austin leaders started to get serious about integration, the registry provided a list of minority-owned businesses.

After being listed, the bookkeepers, attorneys and contractors, wanted a place to advertise more frequently. In 1973 Wyatt responded, and along with his wife Barbara, founded The Villager.

It was also a "good news" newspaper, since most of what was reported in the mainstream media about East Austin at that time tended to be negative.

It was a one-man operation with Wyatt doing all the story writing and selling of advertisements. He also shot and developed the photographs. In 2019 the paper listed six staff, including Tommie Lee Wyatt as Editor-in-Chief and his son, Thomas Wyatt, who was webmaster and handled distribution.

By the time Tommie Lee Wyatt died in January 2026 at age 88, Thomas Wyatt had taken over as Editor-in-Chief.

== Circulation and distribution ==
Initially the free weekly paper quickly reached a circulation of 3000. During the first ten years of publication the print run was 5,000. As of 2020 the print run was 6,000 copies each week.

Although technology changed the media and The Villager became available online, Wyatt continued with the print edition, recognizing that it was a commitment to "accessibility, memory and belonging."

The Villager maintains an online presence through its website and social media platforms which has helped it retain its readership.

As East Austin changed after 2000 and African-Americans moved outside of Austin to places like Pflugerville, Round Rock, Manor, Del Valle, the newspaper's distribution area adapted to reach them.

The free paper is distributed at H-E-B grocery stores, churches and other places around Austin.

== Austin History Center ==
In 2020 the Austin History Center presented a selection of photographs from The Villager in an exhibition titled, "Our Community, Our Voice: Photographs from The Villager Newspaper". The collection includes images of local community members and illustrated the vibrancy of Austin's Black community. Images of marching bands, theater groups, community leaders, musicians, protests, and churches, portray life through the decades in the African American community. The exhibition began January 30 and ended April 19, 2020.
