= Dallas Post Tribune =

African American newspaper in Dallas-Fort Worth area of Texas

- Type: Weekly newspaper
- Owner: Post Tribune Publishing Company
- Founder: Bert C. Muse
- Publisher: Shirley Gray
- Founded: 1947
- Language: English
- Headquarters: 2726 S. Beckley Avenue, Dallas, TX
- Website: dallasposttrib.com

The Dallas Post Tribune is an African American weekly newspaper published in Dallas. It is distributed throughout the Dallas–Fort Worth area, it is among the largest black owned print publications in North Texas.

== History ==
The Dallas Post Tribune was originally created in 1947 in Tyler, Texas by Bert C. Muse. Before taking its current name, the newspaper operated under previous titles including the Tyler Morning Tribune and The Dallas Star Post. According to the print media experts Echo Media, the Dallas Post Tribune currently holds the title of being the largest black-owned newspaper in the northern Texas area.

Fred J. Finch Jr., a Dallas attorney affiliated with the Post Tribune in the 1980s, went on to found The Dallas Examiner, with a focus on a racially diverse audience, quality journalism and savvy business management. Finch retained an ownership stake in the Post Tribune.

== Coverage and editorial style ==
Published every Thursday, the paper focuses on local African American community affairs. Media scholars have noted that during the 1990s, the publication featured traditional coverage for a Black weekly, emphasizing church announcements, local organization news, resident achievements, and commentary on civil rights issues alongside general local news.
