= Daisy Bates (activist) =

American civil rights activist (1914–1999)

- Born: Daisy Lee Gatson; November 11, 1914; Huttig, Arkansas, U.S.
- Died: November 4, 1999 (aged 84); Little Rock, Arkansas, U.S.
- Occupations: Publisher; journalist; lecturer; civil rights activist
- Known for: Little Rock Integration Crisis of 1957
- Spouse: L. C. Bates (m. 1942)

Daisy Bates (November 11, 1914 – November 4, 1999) was an American civil rights activist, publisher, journalist, and lecturer who played a leading role in the Little Rock Integration Crisis of 1957.

== Early life ==
Daisy Bates was born on November 11, 1914, to Hezekiah Gatson and Millie Riley. She grew up in southern Arkansas in the small sawmill town of Huttig. Gatson supported the family by working as a lumber grader in a local mill. Her mother was murdered when Daisy was an infant, and the girl was given care by her mother's close Friends: Orlee Smith, a World War I veteran, and his wife Susie. Her father abandoned her, and Daisy never saw him again. In The Death of My Mother, Bates recounted learning, at the age of eight, that her birth mother had been raped and murdered by three local white men, and her body thrown into a millpond, where it was later discovered.

Learning that no one was prosecuted for her mother's murder stoked Daisy's anger about injustice. Her adoptive father, Orlee Smith, told her that the killers were never found and that the police showed little interest in the case. Daisy wanted vengeance. She later wrote:

"My life now had a secret goal – to find the men who had done this horrible thing to my mother." She eventually identified one of her mother's killers. At a commissary, she stumbled upon a gaze from a young white man that would imply that he was involved. After this interaction, Daisy would go there often to belittle the drunken man with just her eyes. The young man later pleaded with Daisy, "In the name of God, please leave me alone." He drank himself to death and was found in an alleyway.

She began to hate white people. Out of concern and hope, her adoptive father gave her some advice from his deathbed:

You're filled with hatred. Hate can destroy you, Daisy. Don't hate white people just because they're white. If you hate, make it count for something. Hate the humiliations we are living under in the South. Hate the discrimination that eats away at the South. Hate the discrimination that eats away at the soul of every black man and woman. Hate the insults hurled at us by white scum—and then try to do something about it, or your hate won't spell a thing.

Bates said she had never forgotten that. She believed that this memory supported her strength for leadership in the cause of civil rights.

Before Daisy was exposed to her birth mother's death, she often played with Beatrice, a white girl around her age. They shared pennies for hard candy, and got along well.

Bates's childhood included attendance in Huttig's segregated public schools, where she learned firsthand the poor conditions to which black students were exposed. Orlee Smith died when Bates was a teenager. Bates deeply appreciated him, leading to her own assumption that she married her husband because he shared similar qualities with Smith. Bates had great adulation for the man where she couldn't "remember a time when this man I called my father didn't talk to me almost as if I were an adult". In contrast to their relationship, Daisy had an austere relationship with her adoptive mother. Susie Smith would punish Daisy, who was "often clobbered, tamed, switched, and made to stand in the corner". After the death of Orlee Smith, the two had a falling out.

Daisy was 17 when she started dating Lucius Christopher Bates, an insurance salesman who had also worked on newspapers in the South and West. Daisy was only 15 years old when they first met, and Lucius was still married to Kassandra Crawford. Lucius divorced his first wife in 1941 before moving to Little Rock and starting the Arkansas State Press. Daisy and L.C. Bates married on March 4, 1942.

In 1952, Daisy Bates was elected president of the Arkansas Conference of NAACP branches.

== Arkansas State Press ==
After their move to Little Rock, the Bateses decided to act on a dream of theirs, the ownership of a newspaper. They leased a printing plant that belonged to a church publication and inaugurated the Arkansas State Press, a weekly statewide newspaper. The first issue appeared on May 9, 1941.

The Arkansas State Press was primarily concerned with advocacy journalism and was modeled off other African-American publications of the era, such as the Chicago Defender and The Crisis. Civil rights stories were displayed on the front page. It ran stories about the achievements of Black Arkansans as well as social, religious and sporting news. It also reported incidents of racial discrimination. Pictures were also in abundance throughout the paper.

The paper became an avid voice for civil rights even before a nationally recognized movement had emerged. Daisy Bates was later recognized as co-publisher of the paper.

As the former president of the Arkansas State Conference of the NAACP, Bates was involved deeply in desegregation events. Even though in 1954 the United States Supreme Court decision in Brown v. Board of Education made all segregated schools illegal, the schools in Arkansas refused to enroll African American students. Bates and her husband tried to fight against the situation in their newspaper. The Arkansas State Press became a fervent supporter of the NAACP's integrated public school events. The State Press editorialized, "We feel that the proper approach would be for the leaders among the Negro race—not clabber mouths, Uncle Toms, or grinning appeasers to get together and counsel with the school heads." Concerning the policy of academic desegregation, the State Press cultivated a spirit of immediatism within the hearts of African-American and white citizens. Opposite to a gradual approach, this newspaper mainly wanted immediate reform in Arkansas's educational system. The Arkansas State Press reported that the NAACP was the lead organizer in these protest events, and the newspaper also tended to enlarge national influence to let more people get involved in the educational events in Little Rock.

While Governor Orval Faubus and his supporters were refusing even token desegregation of Central High School, this editorial appeared on the front page:

It is the belief of this paper that since the Negro's loyalty to America has forced him to shed blood on foreign battle fields against enemies, to safeguard constitutional rights, he is in no mood to sacrifice these rights for peace and harmony at home.

Throughout its existence, the Arkansas State Press covered all social news happening within the state. It was an avid supporter of racial integration in schools and thoroughly publicized its support in its pages. In 1957, because of its strong position during the Little Rock Segregation Crisis, white advertisers held another boycott to punish the newspaper for supporting desegregation. This boycott successfully cut off funding, except the money which came directly and through advertisements from the NAACP national office, and through ads from supporters throughout the country. Despite this the State Press was unable to maintain itself and the last issue was published on October 29, 1959.

== Involvement with NAACP ==
Daisy Bates immediately joined the local branch of the NAACP upon moving to Little Rock. In an interview she explains her history with the organization and that all her "dreams were tied with this organization". Her father was a member of the NAACP many years before and she recounts asking him why he joined the organization. She said her father would bring her back literature to read and after learning of their goals she decided to dedicate herself, too.

In the same interview when asked what she and the organization were focused on changing, Bates responded "the whole darned system". However, it was after the Brown v. Board of Education decision that she began to focus mostly on education.

Bates became president of The Arkansas Conference of Branches in 1952 at the age of 38. She remained active and was on the National Board of the NAACP until 1970. Due to her position in NAACP, Bates's personal life was threatened much of the time. In her autobiography, Bates discussed her life as a president of the NAACP in Arkansas:

As President of the NAACP State Conference of Branches and as the publicized leader of the integration movement in Arkansas, I was singled out for 'special treatment.' Two flaming crosses were burned on our property. The first, a six-foot gasoline-soaked structure, was stuck into our front lawn just after dusk. At the base of the cross was scrawled: "GO BACK TO AFRICA! KKK." The second cross was placed against the front of our house, lit, and the flames began to catch. Fortunately, the fire was discovered by a neighbor and we extinguished it before any serious damage had been done.

== Little Rock Integration Crisis ==
Bates and her husband were important figures in the African-American community in the capital city of Little Rock. They published a local black newspaper, the Arkansas State Press, which publicized violations of the Supreme Court's desegregation rulings.

The plan for desegregating the schools of Little Rock was to be implemented in three phases, starting first with the senior and junior high schools, and then only after the successful integration of senior and junior schools would the elementary schools be integrated. After two years and still no progress, a suit was filed against the Little Rock School District in 1956. The court ordered the school board to integrate the schools as of September 1957. "The battle for the soul of Little Rock had indeed begun, and Bates entered vigorously."

As the leader of the NAACP branch in Arkansas, Bates guided and advised the nine students, known as the Little Rock Nine, when they attempted to enroll in 1957 at Little Rock Central High School, a previously all-white institution. The students' attempts to enroll provoked a confrontation with Governor Orval Faubus, who called out the National Guard to prevent their entry. The guard only allowed the white students to pass through the school gate. Eight students out of the nine were asked to go back home. One student, Elizabeth Eckford, didn't receive the message from Daisy Bates the previous night and was met by a white mob outside the school as she tried to find the other eight students in that morning. The mob threatened to kill the black students; members of the mob harassed not only activists but also Northern journalists who came to cover the story.

Bates used her organizational skills to plan a way for the nine students to get into Central High. She planned for ministers to escort the children into the school, two in front of the children and two behind. She thought that not only would they help protect the children physically but having ministers accompany them would "serve as powerful symbols against the bulwark of segregation". Bates continued with her task of helping the nine enroll in school. She spoke with their parents several times throughout the day to make sure they knew what was going on. She joined the parent-teacher organization, even though she did not have a student enrolled in school. She was persistent and realized that she needed to dominate the situation in order to succeed.

Bates was a pivotal figure in that seminal moment of the Civil Rights Movement. Osro Cobb, the United States Attorney for the Eastern District of Arkansas refers in his memoirs to her, accordingly:

... Mrs. Daisy Bates and her charges arrived at the school. With surprising ease, they were admitted through one of the less conspicuous entrances. Seconds later, a white female student climbed through a first-story window and yelled that she wasn't going to school with 'niggers'.

Nevertheless, the pandemonium at Central High School caused superintendent Virgil Blossom to dismiss school that first day of desegregation, and the crowds dispersed. U.S. President Dwight D. Eisenhower intervened by federalizing the Arkansas National Guard and dispatching the 101st Airborne Division to Little Rock to ensure that the court orders were enforced. The troops maintained order, and desegregation proceeded. In the 1958–59 school year, however, public schools in Little Rock were closed in another attempt to roll back desegregation. That period is known as "The Lost Year" in Arkansas.

A significant role of Bates during the Civil Rights Movement was the advocating and mentoring of the Little Rock Nine. Bates's house became a National Historic Landmark in 2002 because of her role during the desegregation of schools. Her house served as a haven for The Little Rock Nine. The planning of how desegregation would be carried out and the goals to implement were an important part of her role during the movement and specifically, the house was a way to help achieve advocacy for civil rights. Her house also was an official drop off and pick up place for the Little Rock Nine before and after school, every day. Because her house was an official meeting place, it became a center for violence and was often damaged by segregation supporters.

The perseverance of Mrs. Bates and the Little Rock Nine during these turbulent years sent a strong message throughout the South that desegregation worked and the tradition of racial segregation under "Jim Crow" would no longer be tolerated in the United States of America.

In 1998, a spokeswoman for Bates stated that Bates had felt guilty for her failure to notify one of the young ladies, Elizabeth Eckford, that they were delaying the entrance into Central High School. The family of the child had no telephone, and the father did not return from work until 3 a.m. Eckford didn't know that she needed her parents to accompany her, and she also didn't know that she needed to gather with other black students that morning. As a result, Eckford met a mob by herself, when a kind reporter, Grace Lorch, took her out of the mob and guided her to the bus station. The previous night, Bates fell asleep before she was able to deliver the message to the family, and the girl attempted to attend her first day alone at the segregated school. Bates not only wanted the black students to receive the same level of education as white students, but she also wanted to make it her job for all races to have the same quality of education.

The Little Rock City Council instructed the Little Rock police chief to arrest Bates and other NAACP figures; she and the local branch president surrendered voluntarily. They were charged with failing to provide information about NAACP members for the public record, in violation of a city ordinance. Though Bates was charged a fine by the judge, the NAACP lawyers appealed and eventually won a reversal in the United States Supreme Court. In a similar case, the high court held that the state of Alabama could not compel the NAACP to turn over its membership list to state officials.

In an interview with Bates, she says the most important contribution she made during the Little Rock crisis was:

the very fact that the kids went in Central; they got in ... And they remained there for the full year. And that opened a lot of doors that had been closed to Negroes, because this was the first time that this kind of revolution had succeeded without a doubt. And none of the children were really hurt physically.

Martin Luther King Jr. sent a telegram in September 1957 regarding the Central High School and Little Rock Nine crisis. King's purpose was to encourage Bates to "adhere rigorously to a way of non-violence", despite being "terrorized, stoned, and threatened by ruthless mobs". He assured her, "World opinion is with you. The moral conscience of millions of white Americans is with you." King was a guest of the Bateses in May 1958 when he spoke at the Arkansas AM&N College commencement. Soon after the commencement, King asked Daisy Bates to be the Women's Day speaker at Dexter Avenue Baptist Church later that year in October. The same year that she was elected to be a speaker at the Baptist church, she was also elected to the executive committee of King's Southern Christian Leadership Conference (SCLC).

The Bateses' involvement in the Little Rock Crisis resulted in the loss of advertising revenue to their newspaper, and it was forced to close in 1959. In 1960, Daisy Bates moved to New York City and wrote her memoir, The Long Shadow of Little Rock, which won a 1988 National Book Award.

This Crisis showed the influence of the local organizations, and Bates's action worked because the government started to have a reaction towards organizations like the NAACP. After the Little Rock Nine crisis in Arkansas, the city enacted ordinances that all organizations should disclose their membership lists, such as the NAACP. The Encyclopedia of Civil Rights in America records that,

In an opinion by Justice Potter Stewart, the Court held that free speech included a freedom of association for expressive purposes. This freedom, the Court believed, was threatened by the attempts of local government officials to obtain the membership lists of the NAACP chapters.

== Later life ==
Bates then moved to Washington, D.C., and worked for the Democratic National Committee. She also served in the administration of U.S. President Lyndon Baines Johnson working on anti-poverty programs. In 1965, she had a stroke and returned to Little Rock.

In 1968, she moved to the rural black community of Mitchellville in Desha County, eastern Arkansas. She concentrated on improving the lives of her neighbors by establishing a self-help program which was responsible for new sewer systems, paved streets, a water system, and community center.

Bates revived the Arkansas State Press in 1984 after L. C. Bates, her husband, died in 1980. In the same year, Bates also earned the Honorary Doctor of Laws degree, which was awarded by the University of Arkansas in Fayetteville.

In 1986, the University of Arkansas Press republished The Long Shadow of Little Rock, which became the first reprinted edition ever to earn an American Book Award. The former First lady Eleanor Roosevelt wrote the introduction for Bates's autobiography. The following year she sold the newspaper, but continued to act as a consultant. Little Rock paid perhaps the ultimate tribute, not only to Bates but to the new era she helped initiate, by opening Daisy Bates Elementary School and by making the third Monday in February George Washington's Birthday and Daisy Gatson Bates Day an official state holiday.

Bates died following a series of strokes, in Little Rock on November 4, 1999, at age 84.

Filmmaker Sharon La Cruise produced and directed a documentary film about Bates. Daisy Bates: First Lady of Little Rock premiered on February 2, 2012, as part of the Independent Lens series on PBS.

In May 2024, a statue depicting Bates was placed inside the U.S. Capitol's National Statuary Hall Collection as one of two statues in the hall to represent Arkansas.

=== Memoir ===
Bates's memoir, The Long Shadow of Little Rock: A Memoir, published in 1962, chronicles her experiences as a civil rights activist during the desegregation of Central High School in Little Rock, Arkansas. The book provides a firsthand account of the Little Rock Nine, a group of nine African American students who integrated the school in 1957, and Bates's role as their mentor and advocate. It details the intense resistance they faced from segregationists, the political turmoil surrounding the integration crisis, and the toll it took on Bates's personal and professional life. Through the book, Bates captures the students' courage and the event's widespread impact on the civil rights movement.

The memoir received widespread critical acclaim for its unflinching depiction of racial injustice and its emphasis on the personal sacrifices made in the struggle for equality. In 1988, over two decades after its initial publication, a reprint edition of The Long Shadow of Little Rock was awarded an American Book Award Special Citation for its enduring significance in American history and literature. The book has since been regarded as an essential primary source for understanding the civil rights movement and the complexities of the integration struggle.

== Honors and awards ==
- Named Woman of the Year in 1957 by the National Council of Negro Women
- Joint recipient, along with the Little Rock Nine of the 1958 Spingarn Medal
- 1988 American Book Award
- Arkansas General Assembly Commendation
- Honorary Doctor of Laws Degree, University of Arkansas, 1984
- Candace Award from the National Coalition of 100 Black Women, 1984
- Diamond Cross of Malta from the Philadelphia Cotillion Society
- Honorary member of Delta Sigma Theta sorority
- Arkansas has established the third Monday in February as "George Washington's Birthday and Daisy Gatson Bates Day", an official state holiday.
- Daisy L. Gatson Bates Drive, formerly 14th Street, that runs to the north of Little Rock Central High School, was renamed for her.
- In her home town of Huttig there is a Daisy L. Gatson Bates St.
- The Daisy Bates Elementary School in Little Rock is named in her honor.
- The Daisy Bates Holiday Committee is headed by African-American State Representative Charles Blake of Little Rock.
- Congressional Gold Medal posthumously awarded by President Bill Clinton along with other members of The Little Rock Nine in November 1999.
- On April 11, 2019, Gov. Asa Hutchinson signed into law a bill that designates Daisy Bates and singer Johnny Cash as the two representatives of the State of Arkansas in the U.S. Capitol's National Statuary Hall Collection. The statue of Bates was formally unveiled at the Capitol on May 8, 2024.

== See also ==
- Daisy Bates House, National Historic Landmark in Little Rock, Arkansas
- List of civil rights leaders
