= John Barrow (Little Rock) =

Area in western Little Rock, Arkansas, United States

Coordinates: 34°43′26″N 92°23′10″W

The John Barrow Addition of Little Rock, Arkansas (often simply referred to as John Barrow) is a neighborhood in the western portion of the city. It is bordered on the north by Kanis Road, on the west by I-430, on the east by Boyle Park, and on the south by Asher Avenue. The area is named for its main thoroughfare, John Barrow Road. Nearby neighborhoods include Briarwood on the north, and Rosedale on the south. To the north lies Baptist Health Medical Center and its environs, as well as small residential areas including Twin Lakes. To the east lie Broadmoor and the vicinity surrounding the University of Arkansas at Little Rock.

John Barrow is a transition neighborhood, progressing from state-of-the-art medical facilities and office complexes to residential areas replete with apartments and single-family homes. Dotted throughout the area are businesses that are evidence of an increasing Hispanic population in Little Rock (also noticeable in Rosedale and Southwest Little Rock), specializing in authentic Mexican foods and crafts. Also central to the neighborhood are the local schools, Parkview Arts and Science Magnet High School and Henderson Health Sciences Magnet Middle School which is now closed, and mortgage loan processing facilities for the largest Arkansas-based bank holding company, Arvest Bank.

Famous People from John Barrow:

Jamaal Anderson—professional football player (NFL)[6].

Derek Fisher—professional basketball player and coach (NBA); 5x NBA champion.

Keith Jackson—member of College Football Hall of Fame and former professional football player (NFL).

Quincy Lewis—professional basketball player.

Duane Washington—professional basketball player (NBA)

== History ==
The neighborhood was platted in the early 1900s. The original 550 acre plat was one of the largest in Pulaski County. The original neighborhood was poorly constructed, with narrow streets, open ditches, and small frame 2 bedroom homes. There was little water service, and sewage was handled by septic systems.

On December 18, 1961, the area was annexed to Little Rock. The city upgraded dirt and gravel roads and brought a sewer system to the neighborhood.
