= The Little Rock =

- The "Little Rock"
- U.S. National Register of Historic Places
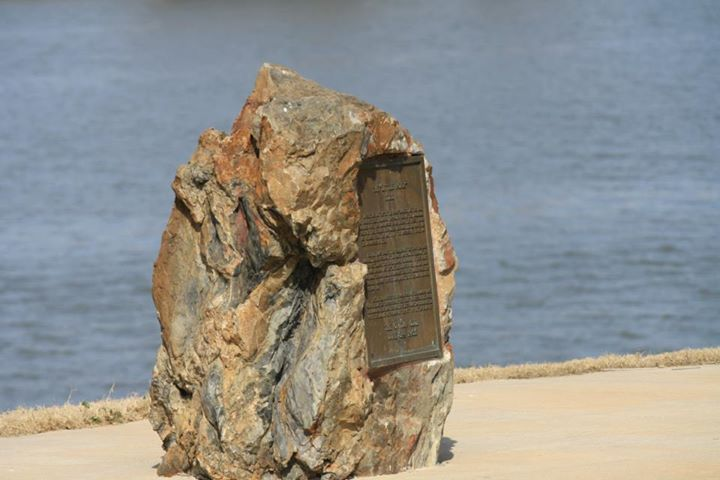

- Location within Arkansas Location within the United States
- Location: On the south bank of the Arkansas River at foot of Rock St., Little Rock, Arkansas
- Coordinates: 34°44′57.3″N 92°15′59.9″W
- Area: less than one acre
- Built: 1722
- NRHP reference No.: 70000124
- Added to NRHP: October 6, 1970

The "Little Rock" is the eponym of Little Rock, Arkansas. It is a now-reduced stone outcrop, projecting into the Arkansas River from its south bank, in the city's waterfront area, adjacent to the Junction Bridge, whose foundations include a portion of the rock. A portion of the rock outcrop has had a bronze plaque mounted on it. The rock, originally estimated to rise about 18 feet (5.5 m) above the river, was first identified as a significant river landmark in 1722 by French explorer Jean-Baptiste Bénard de la Harpe. In 1818 the rock was used as a survey marker, and formed the starting point for land surveys in the region south of the river.

The Little Rock was listed on the National Register of Historic Places in 1970.

== See also ==
- List of individual rocks
- National Register of Historic Places listings in Little Rock, Arkansas
