= Robinwood (Little Rock) =

Residential area in Little Rock, Arkansas, United States

Coordinates: 34°47′09″N 92°22′49″W

Robinwood is an exclusive residential section of northwest Little Rock, Arkansas, marked by several large, stately homes among a wooded area near the Arkansas River. Some of the homes of Robinwood can be seen along the riverside cliffs approaching the city via Interstate 430 from Maumelle. The area is bordered by the interstate and Pleasant Valley to the west, the Arkansas River to its north, and Old Forge to the south. The Reservoir Road area, including the city's Reservoir Park, lies to the east. Development evolved in the Robinwood area during the 1960s and 1970s as Little Rock continued its westward expansion.

Perhaps the most well-known Robinwood residence is the home of local businessman and philanthropist Jennings Osborne. Osborne's home was once an attraction for thousands of drive-by visitors each Christmas season, with cars surrounding the estate and clogging the adjoining Cantrell Road (Highway 10) and nearby interstate. All passers by came to witness the estate covered in an elaborate display of as many as two million red lights each year. Complaints from various neighbors eventually led to intervention by the Arkansas Supreme Court, which ordered an end to the display after the 1995 Christmas season. Osborne has since contributed to holiday light displays in various locations including Berryhill Park in Searcy, Arkansas and Disney-MGM Studios Theme Park at the Walt Disney World Resort in Orlando, Florida.
