= Hanger Hill Historic District =

Historic district in Arkansas, United States

- U.S. National Register of Historic Places
- U.S. Historic district
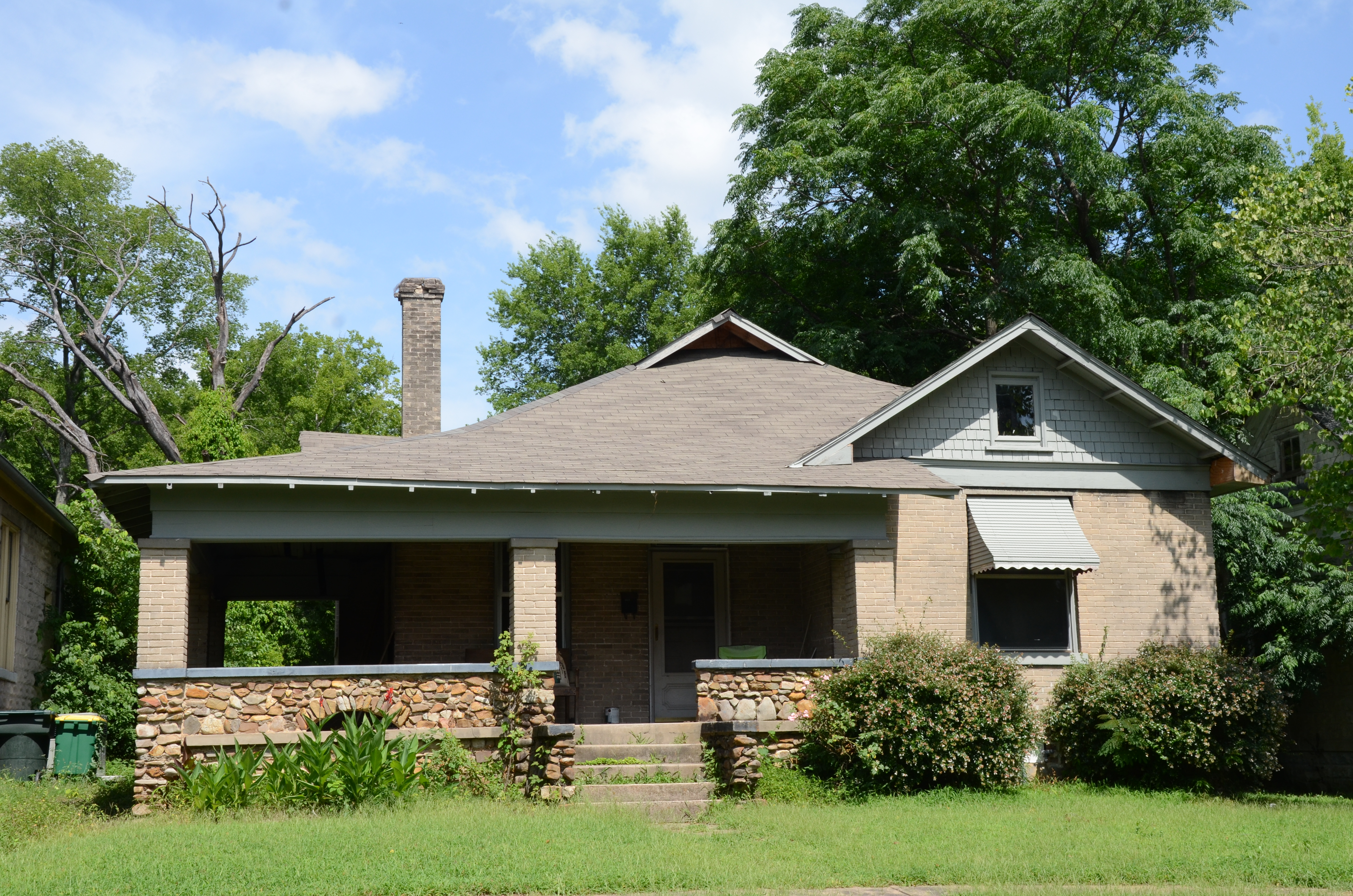

- Location within Arkansas Location within the United States
- Location: 1500 Blk. of Welch St., Little Rock, Arkansas
- Coordinates: 34°43′57″N 92°15′33″W
- Area: 2 acres (0.81 ha)
- Built: 1906
- Built by: Leifer Manufacturing Co.
- Architectural style: Late 19th And 20th Century Revivals, Queen Anne
- NRHP reference No.: 07001466
- Added to NRHP: January 30, 2008

The Hanger Hill Historic District encompasses a collection of early 20th-century residential properties on the 1500 block of Welch Street (between 15th and 16th Streets) in Little Rock, Arkansas. Included are nine historic houses and one carriage barn, the latter a remnant of a property whose main house was destroyed by fire in 1984. The houses are all either Colonial Revival or Queen Anne Victorian, or share some stylistic elements of both architectural styles, and were built between 1906 and 1912. Six of the houses are distinctive in their execution of these styles using rusticated concrete blocks.

The district was listed on the National Register of Historic Places in 2008.

== See also ==
- National Register of Historic Places listings in Little Rock, Arkansas
