= Little Rock, Arkansas =

Capital and largest city of Arkansas, US

Little Rock
- State capital city
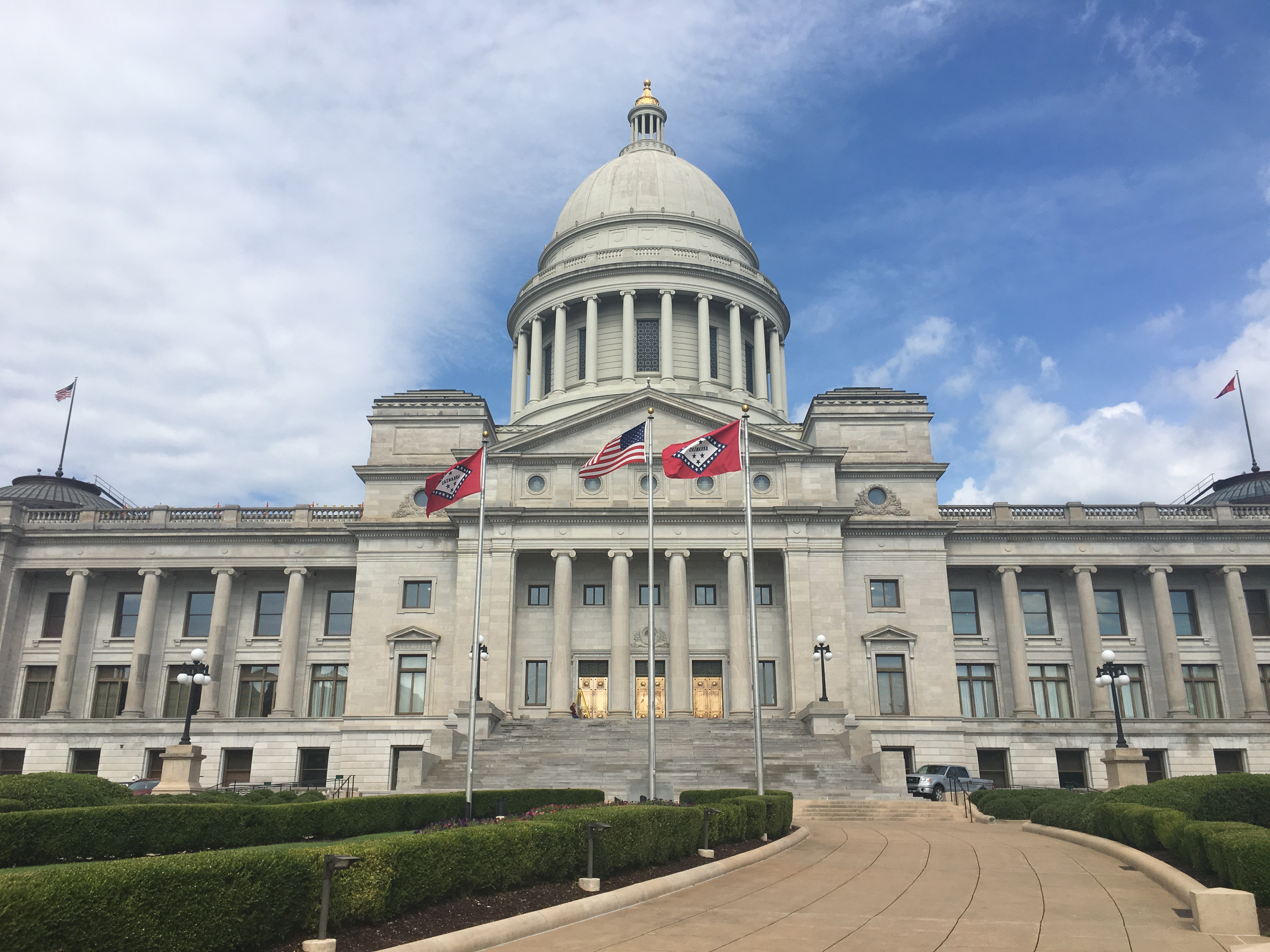
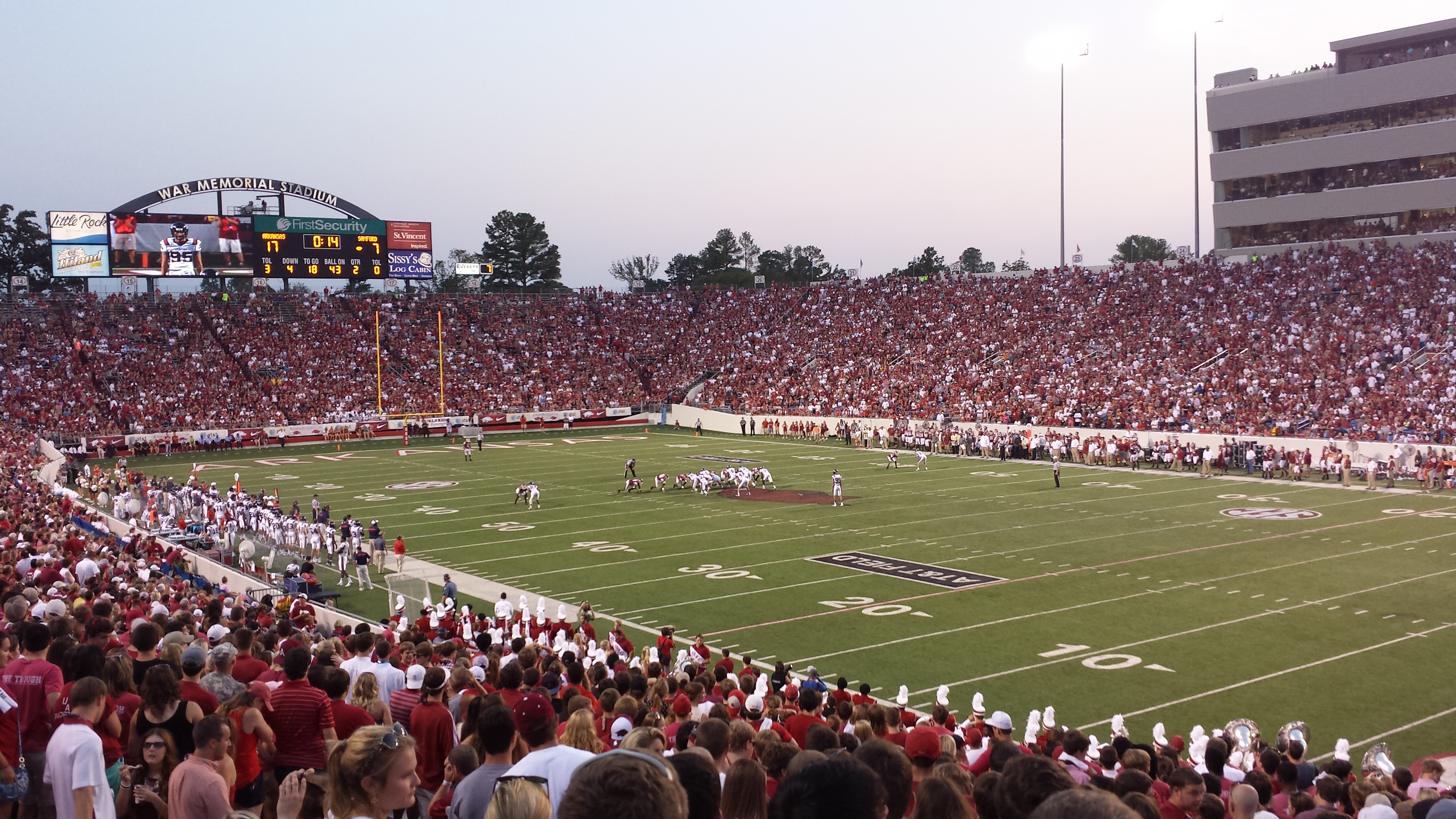
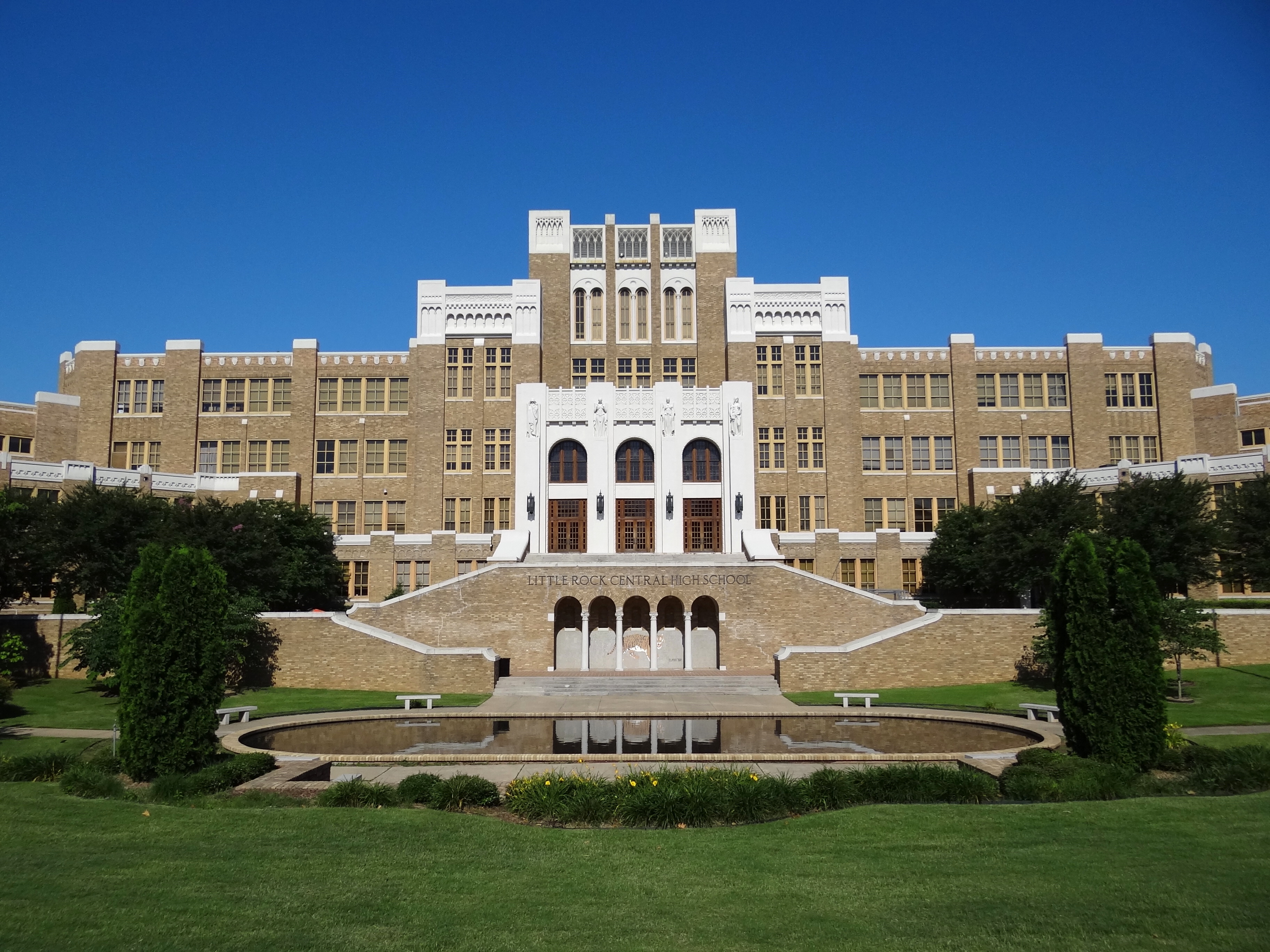
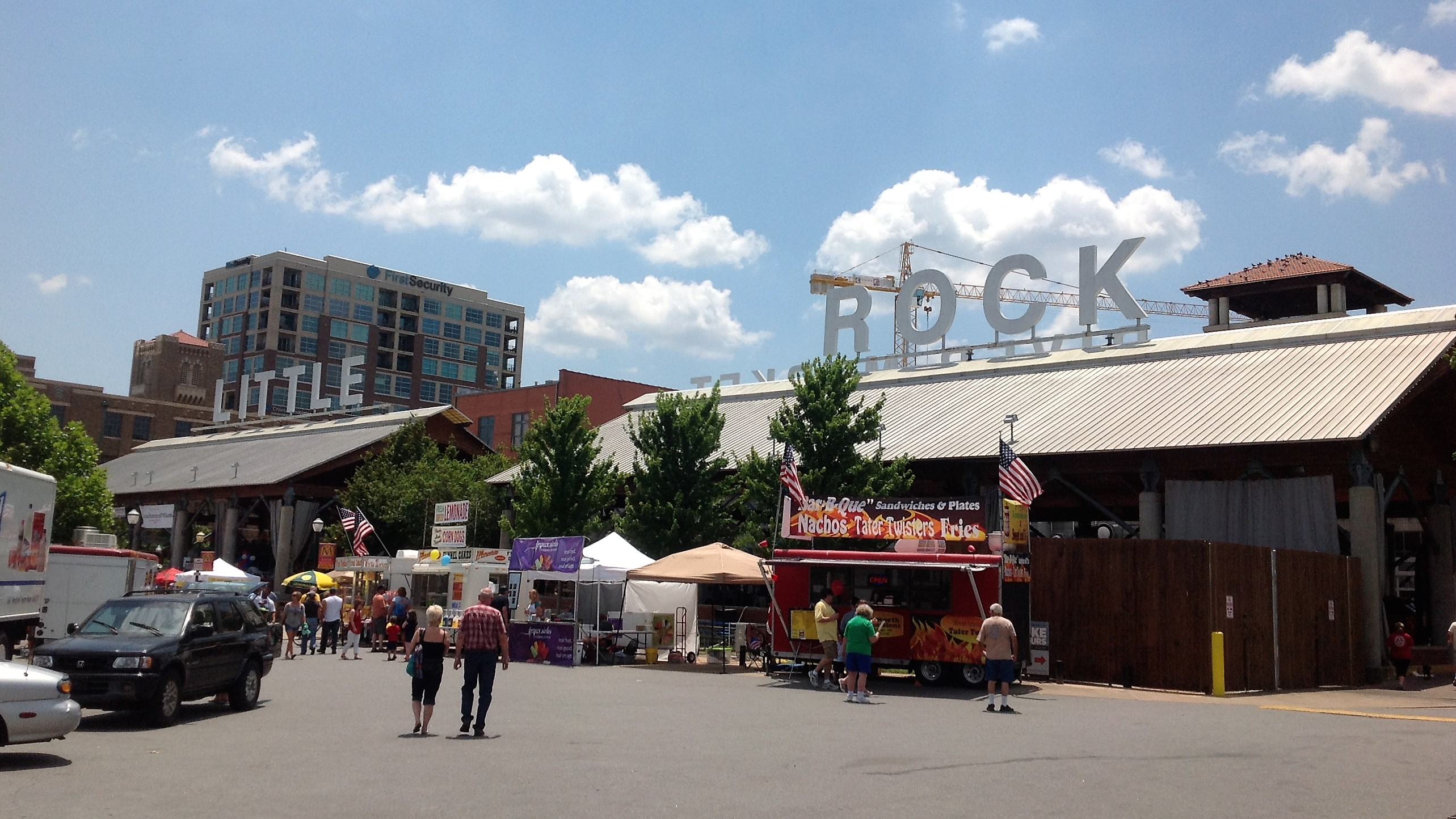
- Downtown Little Rock Clinton Presidential Center Arkansas State Capitol War Memorial Stadium Central High School River Market

- Flag Seal Logo
- Nicknames: The Rock, Rock Town, LR
- Interactive map of Little Rock
- Location within Arkansas Location within the United States Little Rock (North America)
- Coordinates: 34°44′40″N 92°17′17″W
- Country: United States
- State: Arkansas
- County: Pulaski
- Founded: June 1, 1821
- Incorporated (town): November 7, 1831
- Incorporated (city): November 2, 1835
- Named for: The Little Rock

Government
  - Type: Council–manager
  - Body: Little Rock Board of Directors
  - Mayor: Frank Scott Jr. (D)

Area
  - State capital city: 123.00 sq mi (318.58 km^{2})
  - Land: 120.05 sq mi (310.92 km^{2})
  - Water: 2.96 sq mi (7.66 km^{2})
  - Metro: 4,090.34 sq mi (10,593.94 km^{2})
- Elevation: 279 ft (85 m)

Population (2020)
  - State capital city: 202,591
  - Estimate (2025): 206,427 ▲
  - Rank: US: 121st
  - Density: 1,687.6/sq mi (651.58/km^{2})
  - Urban: 461,864 (US: 87th)
  - Urban density: 1,725/sq mi (665.9/km^{2})
  - Metro: 748,031 (US: 81st)
- Demonym: Little Rocker
- Time zone: UTC−06:00 (CST)
  - Summer (DST): UTC−05:00 (CDT)
- ZIP Codes: 72201-72207, 72209-72212, 72214-72217, 72219, 72221-72223, 72225, 72227, 72231, 72255, 72260, 72295
- Area code: 501
- FIPS code: 05-41000
- GNIS feature ID: 2404939
- Website: littlerock.gov

Little Rock is the capital and most populous city of the U.S. state of Arkansas. The population was 202,591 at the 2020 census, while the Little Rock metropolitan area with an estimated 770,000 residents is the 81st-most populous metropolitan area in the United States. The city lies on the south bank of the Arkansas River close to the state's geographic center in central Arkansas. It is the county seat of Pulaski County.

Little Rock was founded in 1821 as the capital of the Arkansas Territory. It is named for a rock formation along the Arkansas River named the "Little Rock" by the French explorer Jean-Baptiste Bénard de la Harpe in 1722. The city played a notable role in U.S. history during the 1957 desegregation of Little Rock Central High School, a key event in the Civil Rights movement. Little Rock is a cultural, economic, government, and transportation center within Arkansas and the American South.

Economically, Little Rock is supported by a mix of sectors including healthcare, banking, transportation, and retail. Companies such as Dillard's and Windstream Holdings are headquartered in the city, and the University of Arkansas for Medical Sciences contributes to its healthcare industry and academic research. Its cultural sites include the Arkansas Museum of Fine Arts, Clinton Presidential Center, and Quapaw Quarter. Outdoor spaces such as the Arkansas River Trail and Pinnacle Mountain State Park provide recreational opportunities within and near the city.

== History ==
=== Pre-Columbian and European exploration ===
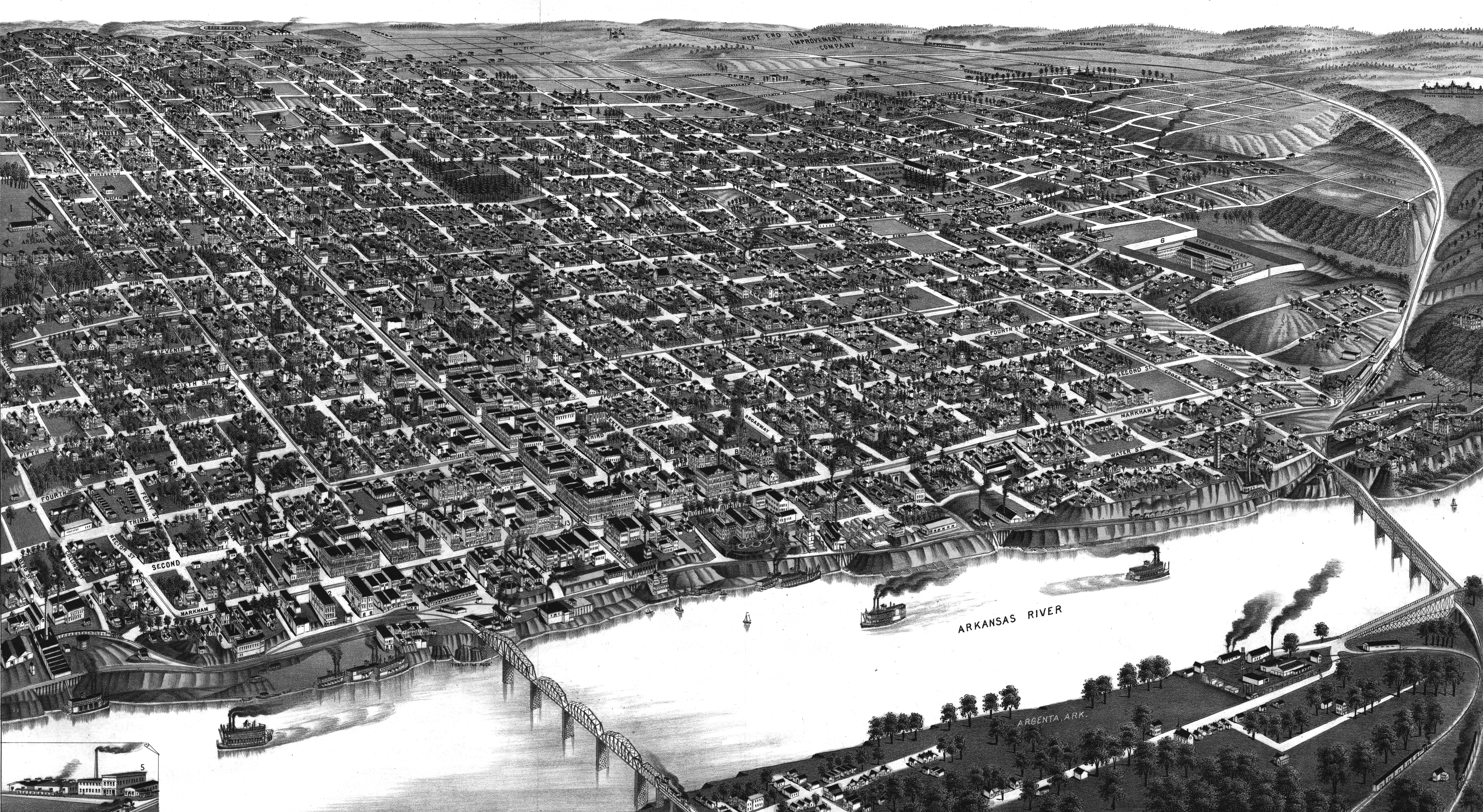
Perspective map of the city of Little Rock, 1887

Little Rock was named for a stone outcropping on the bank of the Arkansas River used by early travelers as a landmark, which marked the transition from the flat Mississippi Delta region to the Ouachita Mountain foothills. It was named in 1722 by French explorer and trader, Jean-Baptiste Bénard de la Harpe. Travelers referred to the area as the "Little Rock". Though there was an effort to officially name the city "Arkopolis" upon its founding in the 1820s, and that name did appear on a few maps made by the US Geological Survey, the name Little Rock is eventually what stuck.

The territorial capitol had been located at Arkansas Post in Southeast Arkansas since 1819, but the site had proven unsuitable as a settlement due to frequent flooding of the Arkansas River. Over the years, the "little rock" was known as a waypoint along the river, but remained unsettled. A land speculator from St. Louis, Missouri who had acquired many acres around the "little rock" began pressuring the Arkansas territorial legislature in February 1820 to move the capital to the site, but the representatives could not decide between Little Rock or Cadron (now Conway), which was the preferred site of Territorial Governor James Miller. The issue was tabled until October 1820, by which time most of the legislators and other influential men had purchased lots around Little Rock. The legislature moved the capital to Little Rock, where it has remained ever since.

=== Desegregation ===
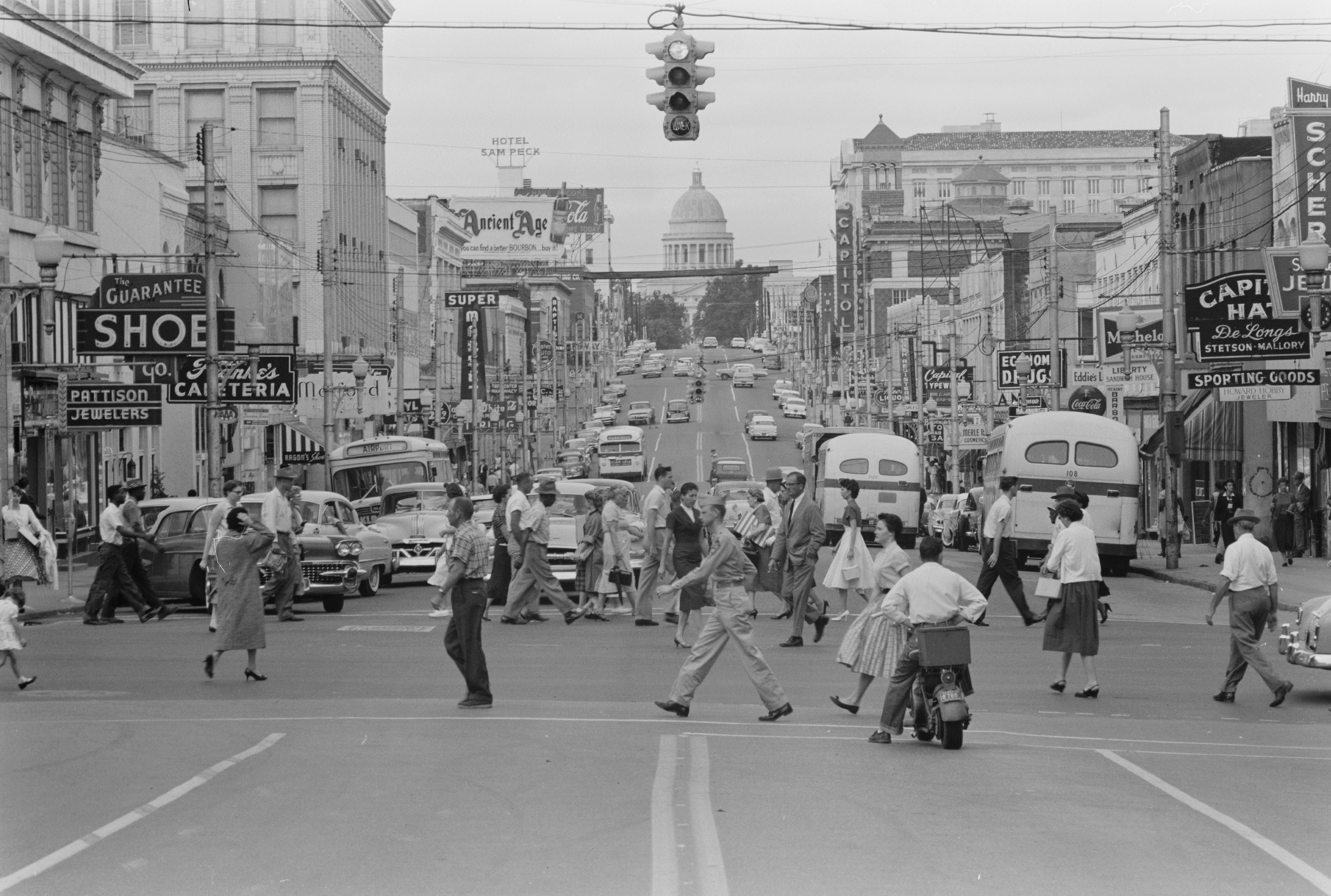
Downtown Little Rock pictured in 1958

The Little Rock Nine were nine African American students who desegregated Little Rock Central High School in 1957 after the Little Rock School Board voted to begin the area's desegregation, in compliance with Brown v. Board of Education. On September 4, 1957, the first day of school at Central High, a mob of white segregationist protesters physically blocked the nine black students from entering the school. Minnijean Brown, Terrence Roberts, Elizabeth Eckford, Ernest Green, Thelma Mothershed, Melba Patillo, Gloria Ray, Jefferson Thomas, and Carlotta Walls, who had been recruited by Daisy Bates and the NAACP, attempted to integrate Central High School, but Governor Orval Faubus deployed the Arkansas National Guard to support the segregationists, and only backed down after federal district court judge Ronald Davies issued an injunction compelling Faubus to withdraw the Guard. Angry white mobs began rioting when the nine black students began attending Central High School. President Dwight D. Eisenhower, on the request of Woodrow Wilson Mann, Little Rock's mayor, deployed the 101st Airborne Division to the city and federalized the Arkansas National Guard to protect the students and ensure their safe passage to the school. Little Rock's four public high schools were closed in September 1958, and reopened a year later. Integration across all grades was not fully achieved until the fall of 1972. The Little Rock school episode drew international attention to the treatment of African Americans in the United States.

== Geography ==
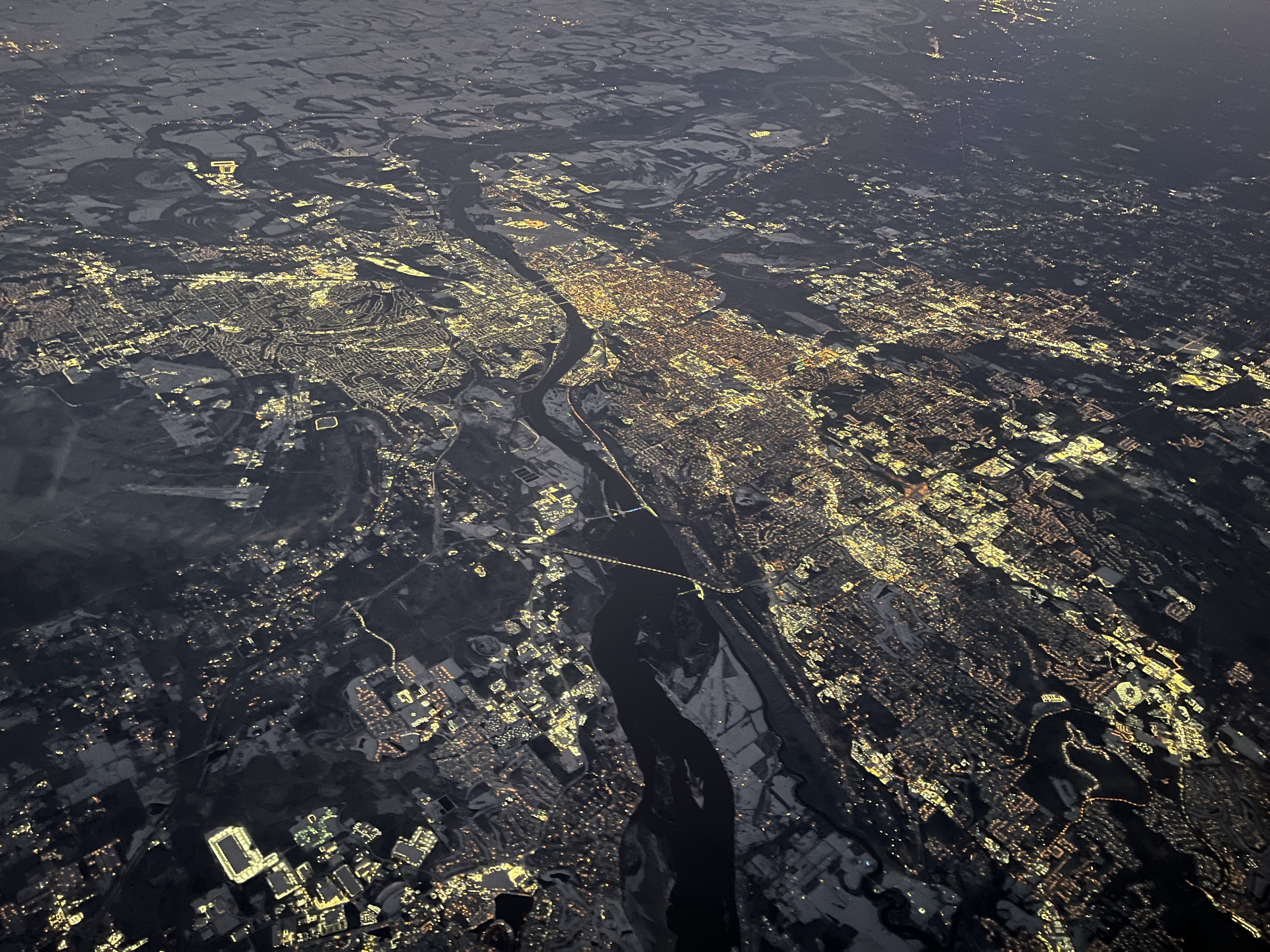
Aerial view in 2024

According to the United States Census Bureau, the city has a total area of 116.8 square miles (303 km^{2}), of which 116.2 square miles (301 km^{2}) is land and 0.6 square miles (1.6 km^{2}) (0.52%) is water.

Little Rock is on the south bank of the Arkansas River in Central Arkansas. Fourche Creek and Rock Creek run through the city, and flow into the river. The western part of the city is in the foothills of the Ouachita Mountains. Northwest of the city limits are Pinnacle Mountain and Lake Maumelle, which provides Little Rock's drinking water.

The city of North Little Rock is just across the river from Little Rock, but it is a separate city. North Little Rock was once the 8th ward of Little Rock. An Arkansas Supreme Court decision on February 6, 1904, allowed the ward to merge with the neighboring town of North Little Rock. The merged town quickly renamed itself Argenta (the local name for the former 8th Ward), but returned to its original name in October 1917.

=== Neighborhoods ===
- Applegate
- Birchwood
- Breckenridge
- Briarwood
- Broadmoor
- Bryce's Creek
- Capitol-Main Historic District
- Capitol View/Stifft's Station
- Central High School Historic District
- Chenal Valley
- Cloverdale
- Colony West
- Downtown
- Echo Valley
- East End
- Fair Park
- Geyer Springs
- Governor's Mansion
- Granite Mountain
- Gum Springs
- Hanger Hill
- Hall High
- The Heights
- Highland Park
- Hillcrest
- John Barrow
- Kingwood
- Leawood
- Mabelvale
- MacArthur Park
- Marshall Square
- Otter Creek
- Pankey
- Paul Laurence Dunbar School
- Pinnacle Valley
- Pleasant Valley
- Pulaski Heights
- Quapaw Quarter
- Riverdale
- Robinwood
- Rosedale
- Scott Street
- St. Charles
- South End
- South Main Street (apartments)
- South Main Street (residential)
- South Little Rock
- Southwest Little Rock
- Stagecoach
- Sturbridge
- University Park
- Walnut Valley
- Walton Heights
- Wakefield
- West End
- Woodlands Edge

=== Climate ===
Little Rock lies in the humid subtropical climate zone (Cfa), with hot, humid summers and cool winters with usually little snow. It has experienced temperatures as low as −12 °F (−24 °C), which was recorded on February 12, 1899, and as high as 114 °F (46 °C), which was recorded on August 3, 2011.

Climate data for Little Rock (Clinton National Airport), 1991−2020 normals, (Note: Mean monthly maxima and minima (i.e. the expected highest and lowest temperature readings at any point during the year or given month) calculated based on data at said location from 1991 to 2020.) extremes 1879−present (Note: Official records for Little Rock began on 1 July 1879 at the State Capitol and maintained there until 30 April 1942. The next day, and until 7 August 1942, temperature and precipitation were recorded separately at two different locations in and around Little Rock, and the official climatology station has been Adams Field since 8 August 1942. For more information, see Threadex)
Month	Jan	Feb	Mar	Apr	May	Jun	Jul	Aug	Sep	Oct	Nov	Dec	Year
Record high °F (°C)	83 (28)	87 (31)	91 (33)	95 (35)	98 (37)	107 (42)	112 (44)	114 (46)	106 (41)	98 (37)	86 (30)	81 (27)	114 (46)
Mean maximum °F (°C)	72.0 (22.2)	75.8 (24.3)	82.2 (27.9)	86.2 (30.1)	91.3 (32.9)	96.2 (35.7)	100.2 (37.9)	101.1 (38.4)	96.2 (35.7)	89.2 (31.8)	79.6 (26.4)	72.8 (22.7)	102.4 (39.1)
Mean daily maximum °F (°C)	50.5 (10.3)	55.2 (12.9)	63.7 (17.6)	72.8 (22.7)	80.5 (26.9)	88.2 (31.2)	91.7 (33.2)	91.5 (33.1)	85.1 (29.5)	74.2 (23.4)	61.9 (16.6)	52.6 (11.4)	72.3 (22.4)
Daily mean °F (°C)	40.7 (4.8)	44.7 (7.1)	52.7 (11.5)	61.4 (16.3)	69.9 (21.1)	78.0 (25.6)	81.4 (27.4)	80.8 (27.1)	74.0 (23.3)	62.6 (17.0)	51.1 (10.6)	43.0 (6.1)	61.7 (16.5)
Mean daily minimum °F (°C)	30.9 (−0.6)	34.2 (1.2)	41.8 (5.4)	50.1 (10.1)	59.3 (15.2)	67.7 (19.8)	71.2 (21.8)	70.1 (21.2)	62.9 (17.2)	50.9 (10.5)	40.2 (4.6)	33.3 (0.7)	51.0 (10.6)
Mean minimum °F (°C)	16.4 (−8.7)	20.5 (−6.4)	26.6 (−3.0)	36.9 (2.7)	47.2 (8.4)	59.8 (15.4)	65.6 (18.7)	63.8 (17.7)	50.4 (10.2)	37.1 (2.8)	26.4 (−3.1)	20.3 (−6.5)	13.6 (−10.2)
Record low °F (°C)	−8 (−22)	−12 (−24)	11 (−12)	28 (−2)	38 (3)	46 (8)	54 (12)	52 (11)	37 (3)	27 (−3)	10 (−12)	−1 (−18)	−12 (−24)
Average precipitation inches (mm)	3.50 (89)	3.97 (101)	4.96 (126)	5.59 (142)	5.08 (129)	3.55 (90)	3.33 (85)	3.16 (80)	3.01 (76)	4.47 (114)	4.72 (120)	5.08 (129)	50.42 (1,281)
Average snowfall inches (cm)	1.1 (2.8)	1.6 (4.1)	0.5 (1.3)	0.0 (0.0)	0.0 (0.0)	0.0 (0.0)	0.0 (0.0)	0.0 (0.0)	0.0 (0.0)	0.0 (0.0)	0.0 (0.0)	0.6 (1.5)	3.8 (9.7)
Average extreme snow depth inches (cm)	1 (2.5)	1 (2.5)	0 (0)	0 (0)	0 (0)	0 (0)	0 (0)	0 (0)	0 (0)	0 (0)	0 (0)	1 (2.5)	1 (2.5)
Average precipitation days (≥ 0.01 in)	9.2	9.3	10.5	9.4	10.9	8.0	8.7	7.2	6.6	8.1	8.5	9.5	105.9
Average snowy days (≥ 0.1 in)	0.5	0.9	0.4	0.0	0.0	0.0	0.0	0.0	0.0	0.0	0.1	0.3	2.2
Average relative humidity (%)	70.2	68.3	65.4	66.7	71.1	70.0	71.6	71.7	73.5	70.4	71.0	70.9	70.1
Average dew point °F (°C)	28.9 (−1.7)	32.4 (0.2)	40.3 (4.6)	49.6 (9.8)	59.2 (15.1)	66.2 (19.0)	70.2 (21.2)	68.5 (20.3)	63.1 (17.3)	51.1 (10.6)	41.7 (5.4)	32.7 (0.4)	50.3 (10.2)
Mean monthly sunshine hours	180.9	188.2	244.5	276.7	325.3	346.2	351.0	323.0	271.9	251.0	176.9	166.2	3,101.8
Percentage possible sunshine	58	62	66	71	75	80	80	78	73	72	57	54	70
Average ultraviolet index	2.5	3.8	5.7	7.6	8.9	9.6	9.8	8.9	7.2	4.9	3.0	2.3	6.1
Source 1: NOAA (relative humidity and dew point 1961-1990, sun 1961−1990 at North Little Rock Airport)
Source 2: UV Index Today (1995 to 2022)

== Demographics ==
Historical population
Census	Pop.	Note	%±
1850	2,167		—
1860	3,727		72.0%
1870	12,380		232.2%
1880	13,138		6.1%
1890	25,874		96.9%
1900	38,307		48.1%
1910	45,941		19.9%
1920	65,142		41.8%
1930	81,679		25.4%
1940	88,039		7.8%
1950	102,213		16.1%
1960	107,813		5.5%
1970	132,483		22.9%
1980	159,151		20.1%
1990	175,795		10.5%
2000	183,133		4.2%
2010	193,524		5.7%
2020	202,591		4.7%
2025 (est.)	206,427	▲	1.9%
U.S. Decennial Census

=== Racial and ethnic composition ===
Little Rock city, Arkansas – Racial and Ethnic Composition Note: the US Census treats Hispanic/Latino as an ethnic category. This table excludes Latinos from the racial categories and assigns them to a separate category. Hispanics/Latinos may be of any race.
Race / Ethnicity (NH = Non-Hispanic)	Pop 2000	Pop 2010	Pop 2020	% 2000	% 2010	% 2020
White alone (NH)	98,904	90,297	85,401	54.01%	46.66%	42.15%
Black or African American alone (NH)	73,679	81,572	81,339	40.23%	42.15%	40.15%
Native American or Alaska Native alone (NH)	450	519	497	0.25%	0.27%	0.25%
Asian alone (NH)	2,992	5,098	7,099	1.63%	2.63%	3.50%
Native Hawaiian or Pacific Islander alone (NH)	43	54	69	0.02%	0.03%	0.03%
Other race alone (NH)	150	277	761	0.08%	0.14%	0.38%
Mixed race or Multiracial (NH)	2,026	2,631	6,958	1.11%	1.36%	3.43%
Hispanic or Latino (any race)	4,889	13,076	20,467	2.67%	6.76%	10.10%
Total	183,133	193,524	202,591	100.00%	100.00%	100.00%

=== 2020 census ===
As of the 2020 census, Little Rock had a population of 202,591. The median age was 37.2 years. 22.3% of residents were under the age of 18 and 15.8% of residents were 65 years of age or older. For every 100 females there were 90.1 males, and for every 100 females age 18 and over there were 86.6 males age 18 and over.

99.0% of residents lived in urban areas, while 1.0% lived in rural areas.

There were 88,229 households in Little Rock, of which 27.3% had children under the age of 18 living in them. Of all households, 33.9% were married-couple households, 22.3% were households with a male householder and no spouse or partner present, and 37.9% were households with a female householder and no spouse or partner present. About 37.9% of all households were made up of individuals and 12.1% had someone living alone who was 65 years of age or older. There were 45,577 families residing in the city.

There were 98,993 housing units, of which 10.9% were vacant. The homeowner vacancy rate was 2.0% and the rental vacancy rate was 12.2%.

Racial composition as of the 2020 census
Race	Number	Percent
White	88,083	43.5%
Black or African American	82,340	40.6%
American Indian and Alaska Native	1,196	0.6%
Asian	7,143	3.5%
Native Hawaiian and Other Pacific Islander	78	0.0%
Some other race	12,193	6.0%
Two or more races	11,558	5.7%

=== 2010 census ===
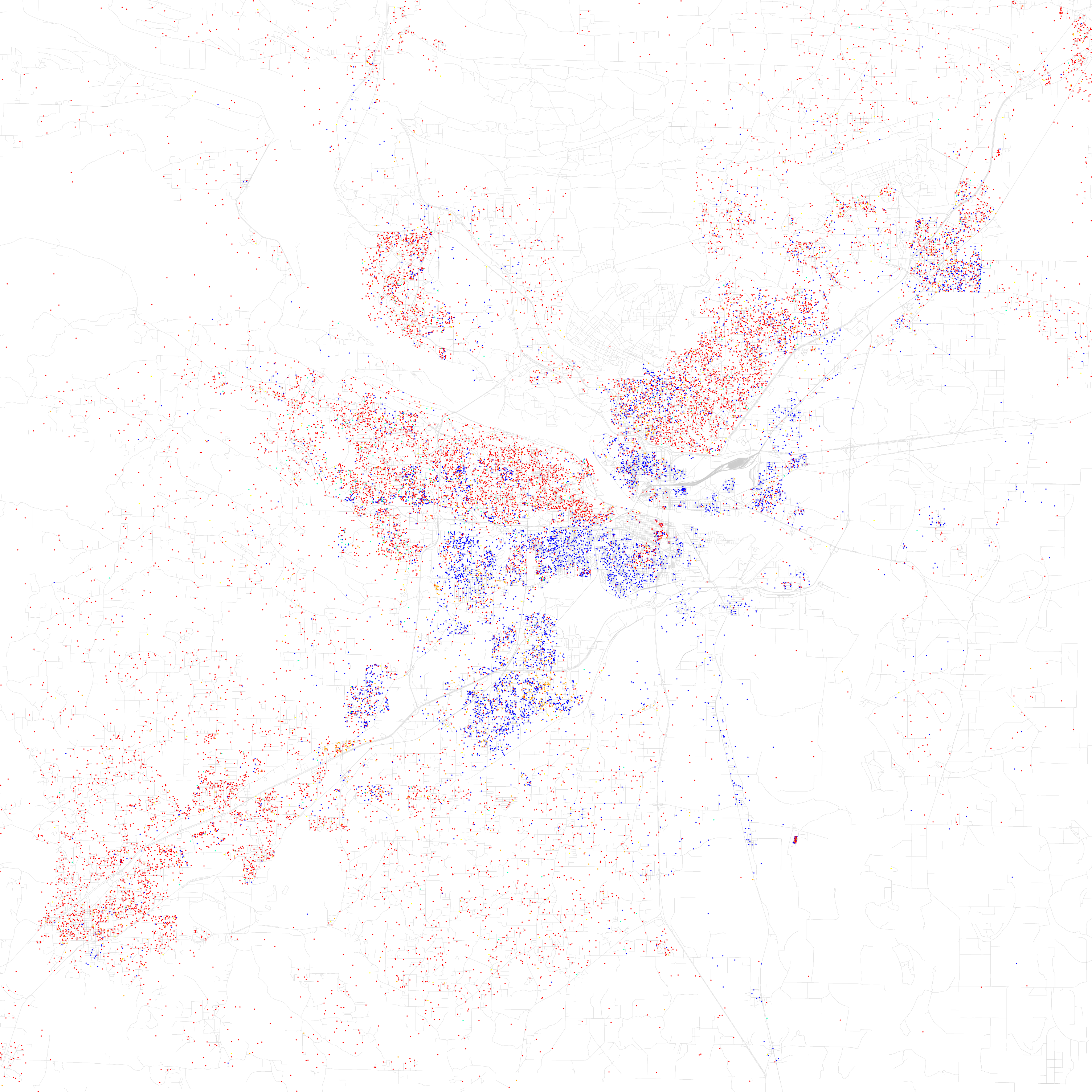
Map of racial distribution in Little Rock, 2010 U.S. Census. Each dot is 25 people: ⬤ White ⬤ Black ⬤ Asian ⬤ Hispanic ⬤ Other

As of the 2010 census, there were 193,524 people, 82,018 households, and 47,799 families residing in the city. The population density was 1,576.0 inhabitants per square mile (608.5/km^{2}). There were 91,288 housing units at an average density of 769.1 per square mile (297.0/km^{2}). The racial makeup of the city was 48.9% White, 42.3% Black, 0.4% Native American, 2.7% Asian, 0.08% Pacific Islander, 3.9% from other races, and 1.7% from two or more races. 6.8% of the population is Hispanic or Latino.

There were 82,018 households, of which 30.5% had children under the age of 18 living with them, 36.6% were married couples living together, 17.5% had a female householder with no husband present, and 41.7% were non-families. 34.8% of all households were made up of individuals, and 8.8% had someone living alone who was 65 years of age or older. The average household size was 2.30 and the average family size was 3.00.

In the city, the population was spread out, with 24.7% under the age of 18, 10.0% from 18 to 24, 31.7% from 25 to 44, 22.0% from 45 to 64, and 11.6% who were 65 years of age or older. The median age was 34 years. For every 100 females, there were 89.2 males. For every 100 females age 18 and over, there were 85 males.

The median income for a household in the city was $37,572, and the median income for a family was $47,446. Males had a median income of $35,689 versus $26,802 for females. The per capita income for the city was $23,209. 14.3% of the population is below the poverty line. Out of the total population, 20.9% of those under the age of 18 and 9.0% of those 65 and older were living below the poverty line.

=== Metropolitan area ===
The 2020 U.S. Census population estimate for the Little Rock-North Little Rock-Conway, AR Metropolitan Statistical Area was 748,031. The MSA covers the following counties: Pulaski, Faulkner, Grant, Lonoke, Perry, and Saline. The largest cities are Little Rock, North Little Rock, Conway, Jacksonville, Benton, Sherwood, Cabot, Maumelle, and Bryant.

=== Crime ===
In the late 1980s, Little Rock experienced a 51% increase in murder arrests of children under 17, and a 40% increase among 18- to 24-year-olds. From 1988 to 1992, murder arrests of youths under 18 increased by 256%. By the end of 1992, Little Rock reached a record of 61 homicides, but in 1993 surpassed it with 76. It was one of the highest per-capita homicide rates in the country, placing Little Rock fifth in Money magazine's 1994 list of most dangerous cities. In July 2017, a shootout occurred at the Power Ultra Lounge nightclub in downtown Little Rock; although there were no deaths, 28 people were injured and one hospitalized. In 2021, Little Rock saw a decrease in most violent crime, but a 24% increase in homicides from 2020. The 65 homicides were the third-most on record in the city. Little Rock set a new record of 81 homicides in 2022.

== Economy ==
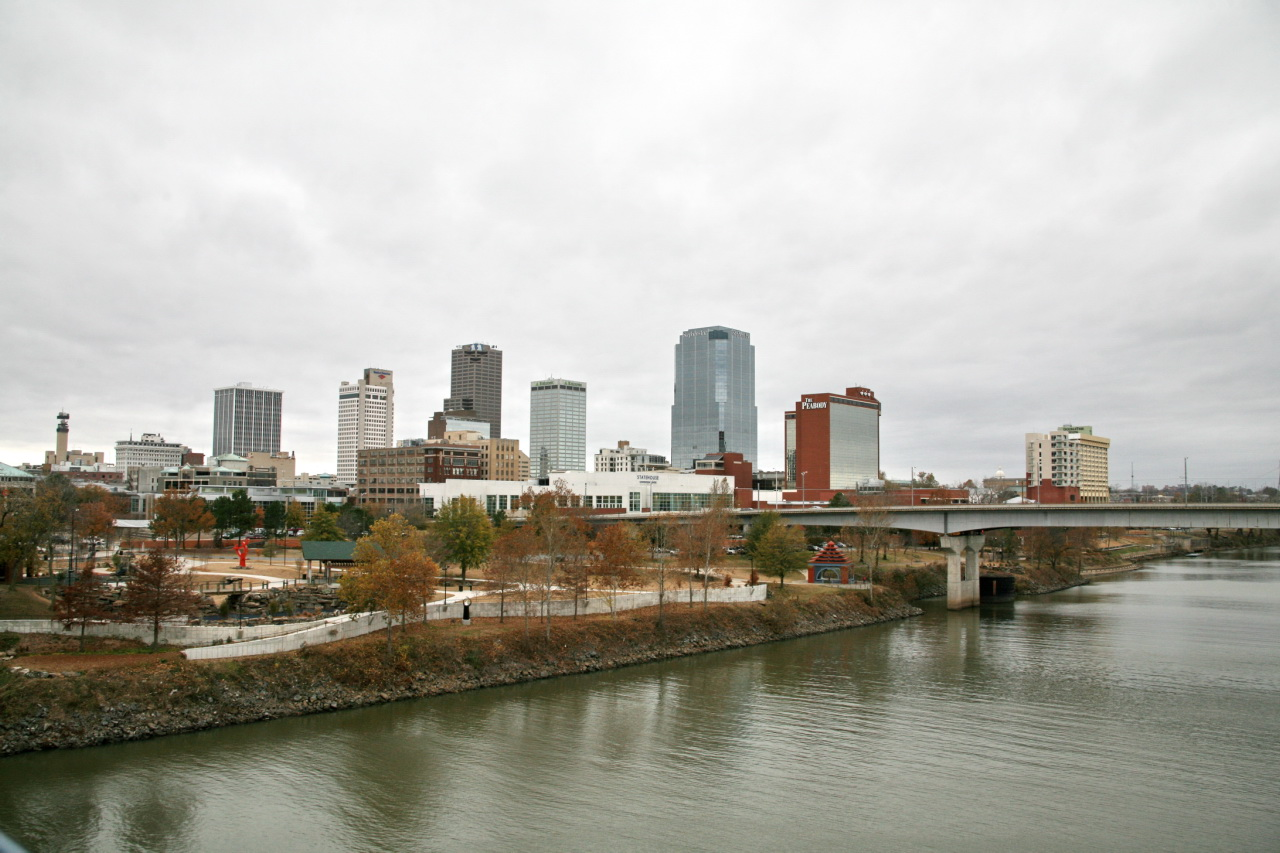
Downtown Little Rock

Dillard's, Windstream Communications and Acxiom, Simmons Bank, Bank OZK, Rose Law Firm, Westrock Coffee, Central Flying Service, and large brokerage Stephens Inc. are headquartered in Little Rock. Large companies headquartered in other cities but with a large presence in Little Rock are Dassault Falcon Jet (near Little Rock National Airport in the eastern part of the city), Fidelity National Information Services (in northwestern Little Rock), and Welspun Corp (in Southeast Little Rock). Little Rock and its surroundings are home to headquarters for large nonprofit organizations, such as Winrock International, Heifer International, the Association of Community Organizations for Reform Now, Clinton Foundation, Lions World Services for the Blind, Clinton Presidential Center, Winthrop Rockefeller Foundation, FamilyLife, Audubon Arkansas, and The Nature Conservancy. Little Rock is also home to the American Taekwondo Association and Arkansas Hospital Association. Arkansas Blue Cross Blue Shield, Baptist Health Medical Center, Entergy, Dassault Falcon Jet, Siemens, AT&T Mobility, Kroger, Euronet Worldwide, L'Oréal, Timex, and UAMS are employers throughout Little Rock.

One of the state's largest public employers, with over 10,552 employees, the University of Arkansas for Medical Sciences (UAMS) and its healthcare partners—Arkansas Children's Hospital and the Central Arkansas Veterans Healthcare System—have a total annual economic impact in Arkansas of about $5 billion. UAMS receives less than 11% of its funding from the state; it is funded by payments for clinical services (64%), grants and contracts (18%), philanthropy and other (5%), and tuition and fees (2%).

The Little Rock port is an inter-modal river port with a large industrial business complex. It is designated as Foreign Trade Zone 14. International corporations such as Danish manufacturer LM Glasfiber have established new facilities adjacent to the port.

Along with Louisville and Memphis, Little Rock has a branch of the Federal Reserve Bank of St. Louis.

== Arts and culture ==
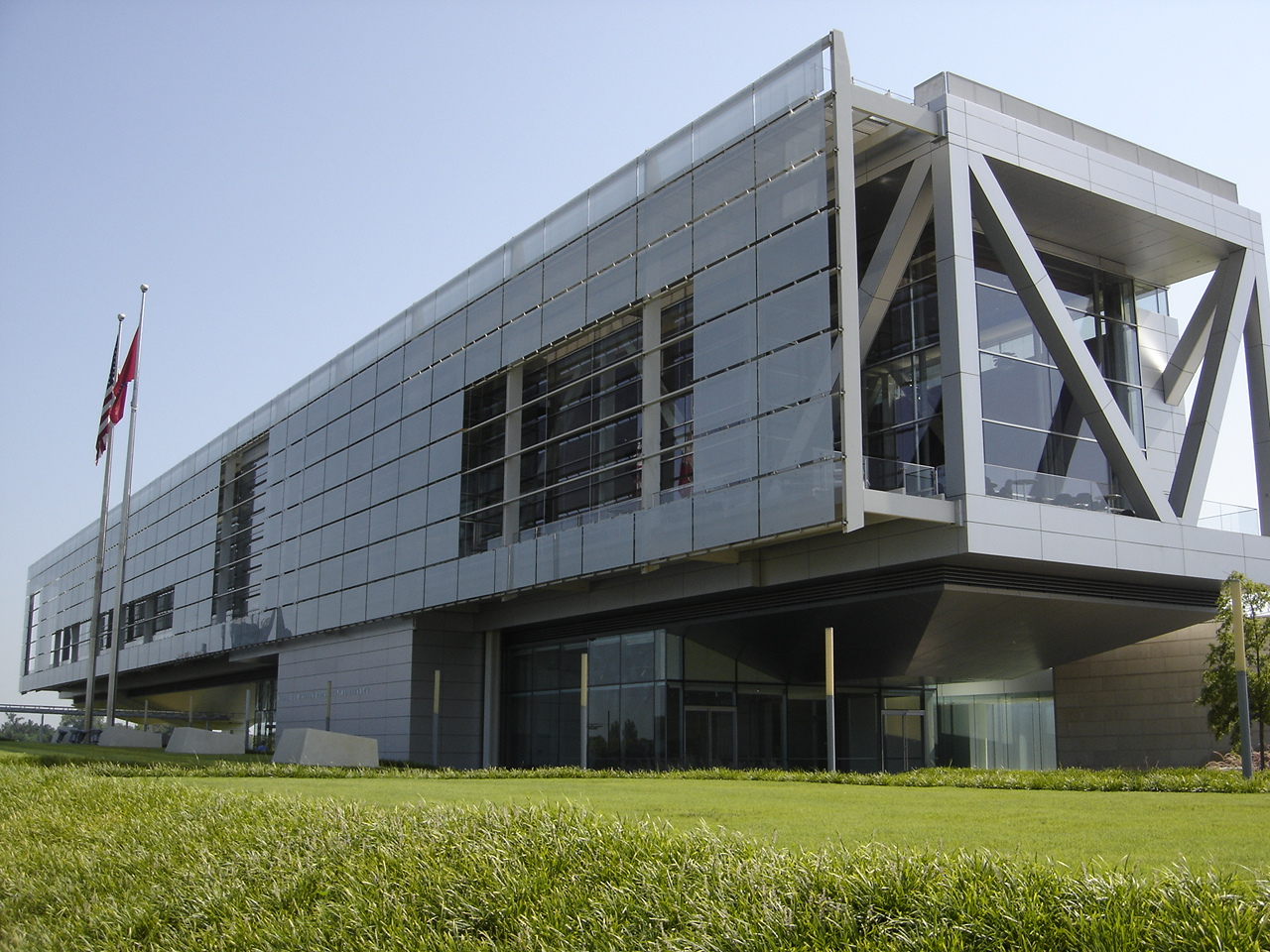
The Clinton Presidential Center in downtown Little Rock opened in 2004.

Cultural sites in Little Rock include:

- Quapaw Quarter – start of the 20th century Little Rock consists of three National Register historic districts with at least a hundred buildings on the National Register of Historic Places.

=== Museums ===
- The Arkansas Museum of Fine Arts, the state's largest cultural institution, is a museum of art and an active center for the visual and performing arts.
- The Museum of Discovery features hands-on exhibits in the fields of science, history and technology.
- The William J. Clinton Presidential Center includes the Clinton presidential library and the offices of the Clinton Foundation and the Clinton School of Public Service. The Library facility, designed by architect James Polshek, cantilevers over the Arkansas River, echoing Clinton's campaign promise of "building a bridge to the 21st century". The archives and library have 2 million photographs, 80 million pages of documents, 21 million e-mail messages, and nearly 80,000 artifacts from the Clinton presidency. The museum within the library showcases artifacts from Clinton's term and has a full-scale replica of the Clinton-era Oval Office. Opened on November 18, 2004, the Clinton Presidential Center cost $165 million to construct and covers 150,000 square feet (14,000 m^{2}) within a 28-acre (113,000 m^{2}) park.
- The Historic Arkansas Museum is a regional history museum focusing primarily on the frontier time period.
- The MacArthur Museum of Arkansas Military History opened in 2001, the last remaining structure of the original Little Rock Arsenal and one of the oldest buildings in central Arkansas, it was the birthplace of General Douglas MacArthur who went on to be the supreme commander of US forces in the South Pacific during World War II.
- The Old State House Museum is a former state capitol building now home to a history museum focusing on Arkansas's recent history.
- The Mosaic Templars Cultural Center is a nationally accredited, state-funded museum and cultural center focusing on African American history and culture in Arkansas.
- The ESSE Purse Museum illustrates the stories of American women's lives during the 1900s through their handbags and the day-to-day items carried in them
- The Little Rock Central High School is still a functioning high school but contains a museum, visitors center, and park on the school grounds.

=== Music and theater ===
Founded in 1976, the Arkansas Repertory Theatre is the state's largest nonprofit professional theatre company. A member of the League of Resident Theatres (LORT D), The Rep has produced more than 300 productions, including 40 world premieres, in its building in downtown Little Rock. Producing Artistic Director John Miller-Stephany leads a resident staff of designers, technicians and administrators in eight to ten productions for an annual audience in excess of 70,000 for MainStage productions, educational programming and touring. The Rep produces works from contemporary comedies and dramas to world premiers and the classics of dramatic literature.

The Community Theatre of Little Rock, founded in 1956, is the area's oldest performance art company.

The Arkansas Symphony Orchestra performs over 30 concerts a year and many events. The Robinson Center Music Hall is the main performance center of the Arkansas Symphony Orchestra. The Wildwood Park for the Arts is the largest park dedicated to the performing arts in the South; it features seasonal festivals and cultural events.

=== Restaurants ===
Lassis Inn was a meeting place for civil rights leaders in the 1950s and 1960s, including Daisy Bates, while they were planning efforts such as the desegregation of Little Rock Central High School. In 2017, it was among the three inaugural inductees into the Arkansas Food Hall of Fame, along with Rhoda's Famous Hot Tamales and Jones Bar-B-Q Diner. In 2020, it was named an America's Classic by the James Beard Foundation.

== Sports ==
Club	League	Venue	Established	Championships
Arkansas Travelers	Texas League	Dickey-Stephens Park	1963 (played as the Little Rock Travelers from 1887 to 1961)	9
Little Rock Lightning	The Basketball League	Hall High School	2020	0
Little Rock Rangers	USL League Two	War Memorial Stadium	2016	0
Little Rock Trojans	NCAA Division I (Ohio Valley Conference)	Jack Stephens Center and Gary Hogan Field	1927	3
Arkansas Wolves FC	National Premier Soccer League	Scott Field	2021	0

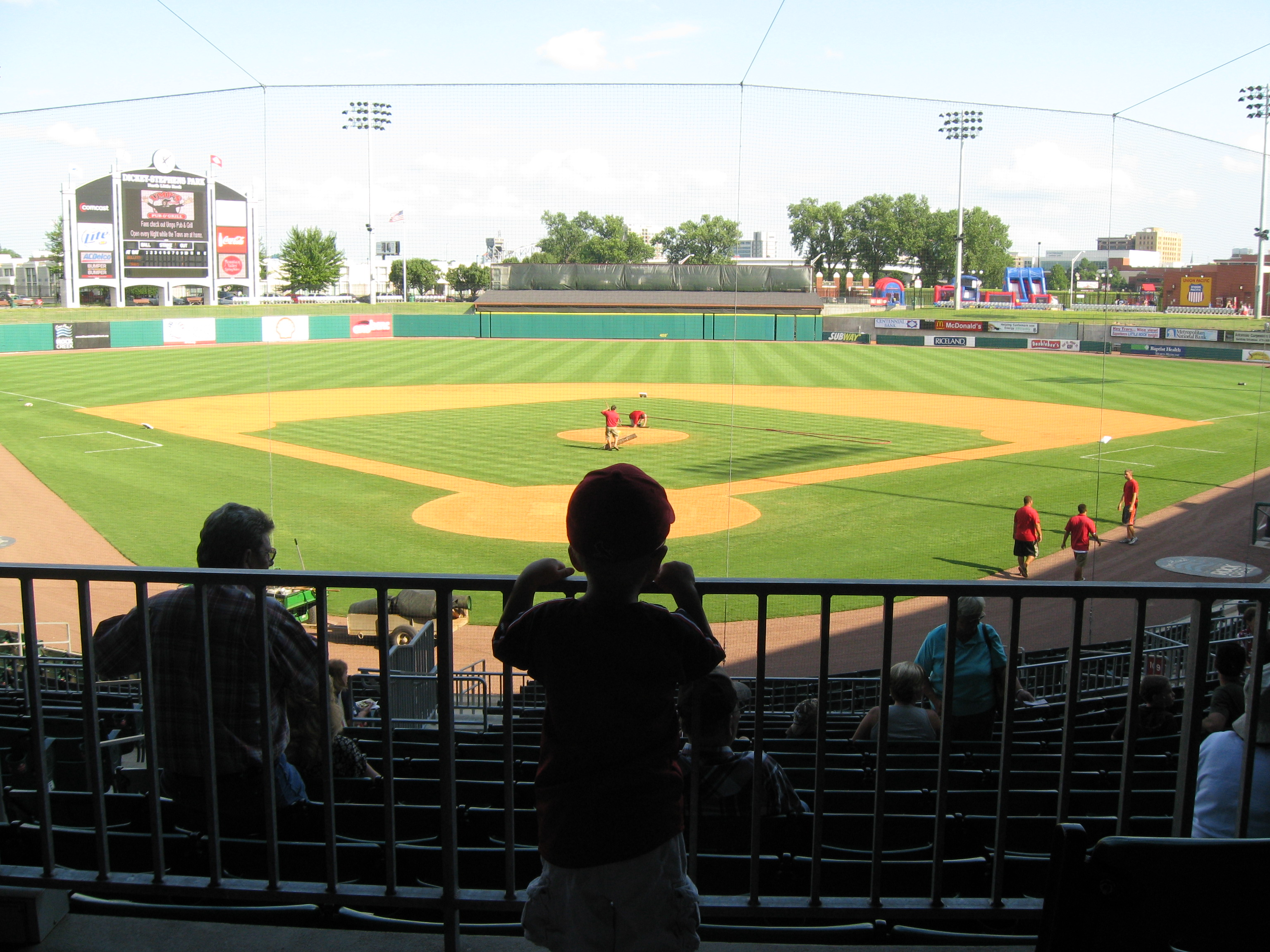
Dickey–Stephens Park

Little Rock is home to the Arkansas Travelers. They are the AA professional Minor League Baseball affiliate of the Seattle Mariners in the Texas League. The Travelers played their last game in Little Rock at Ray Winder Field on September 3, 2006, and moved into Dickey–Stephens Park in nearby North Little Rock in April 2007.

The Little Rock Rangers soccer club of the National Premier Soccer League played their inaugural seasons in 2016 and 2017 for the men's and women's teams respectively. Home games are played at War Memorial Stadium.

Little Rock was also home to the Arkansas Twisters (later Arkansas Diamonds) of Arena Football 2 and Indoor Football League and the Arkansas RimRockers of the American Basketball Association and NBA Development League. Both of these teams played at Verizon Arena in North Little Rock.

The city is also home to the Little Rock Trojans, the athletic program of the University of Arkansas at Little Rock. The majority of the school's athletic teams are housed in the Jack Stephens Center, which opened in 2005. As of 2022, the Trojans play in the Ohio Valley Conference.

Little Rock's War Memorial Stadium hosts at least one University of Arkansas Razorback football game each year. The stadium is known for being in the middle of a golf course. Each fall, the city closes the golf course on Razorback football weekends to allow the estimated 80,000 people who attend take part in tailgating activities. War Memorial also hosts the Arkansas High School football state championships, and starting in the fall of 2006 hosts one game apiece for the University of Central Arkansas and the University of Arkansas at Pine Bluff. Arkansas State University also plays at the stadium from time to time.

Little Rock was a host of the First and Second Rounds of the 2008 NCAA men's basketball tournament. It has also been a host of the SEC women's basketball tournament.

The now defunct Arkansas RiverBlades and Arkansas GlacierCats, both minor-league hockey teams, were in the Little Rock area. The GlacierCats of the now defunct Western Professional Hockey League (WPHL) played in Little Rock at Barton Coliseum while the RiverBlades of the ECHL played at the Verizon Arena.

Little Rock is home to the Grande Maumelle Sailing Club. Established in 1959, the club hosts multiple regattas during the year on both Lake Maumelle and the Arkansas River.

Little Rock is also home to the Little Rock Marathon, held on the first Saturday of March every year since 2003. The marathon features the world's largest medal given to marathon participants.

== Parks and recreation ==
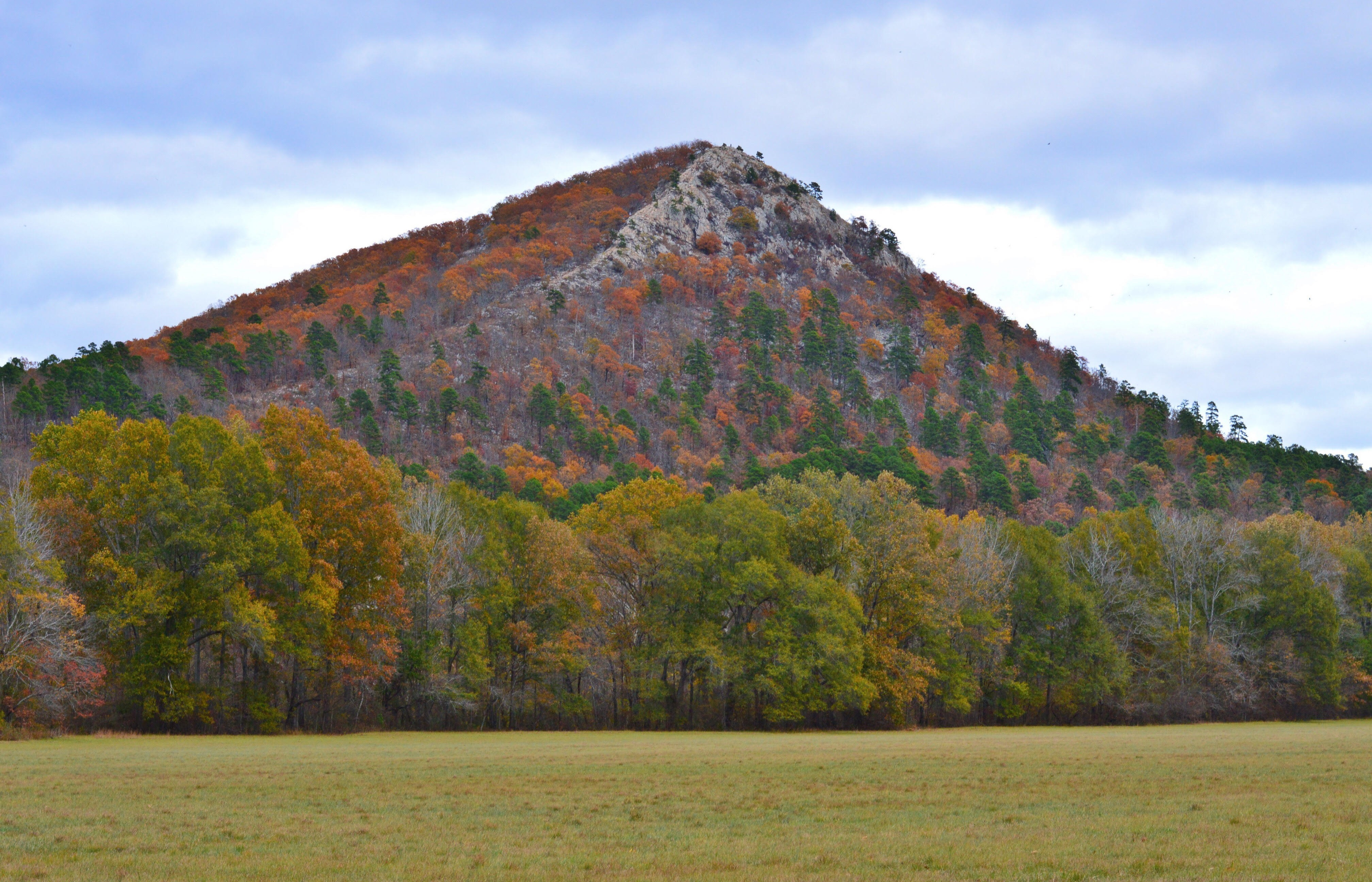
Pinnacle Mountain

Little Rock has 48 parks in its park system.

The region's largest park is Pinnacle Mountain State Park, a 2,000 acres (810 ha) park surrounding Pinnacle Mountain in the Ouachita Mountains. The Arkansas Arboretum at the park features flora and tree plantings correspond to Arkansas's six geographical regions.

The Arkansas River Trail runs 17 miles (27 km) along both sides of the Arkansas River through a portion of Little Rock, including over the Big Dam Bridge, the longest pedestrian/bicycle bridge in North America that has never been used by trains or motor vehicles at 4,226 feet (1,288 m).

Little Rock Zoo, founded in 1926, consists of at least 725 animals and over 200 species.

== Government ==
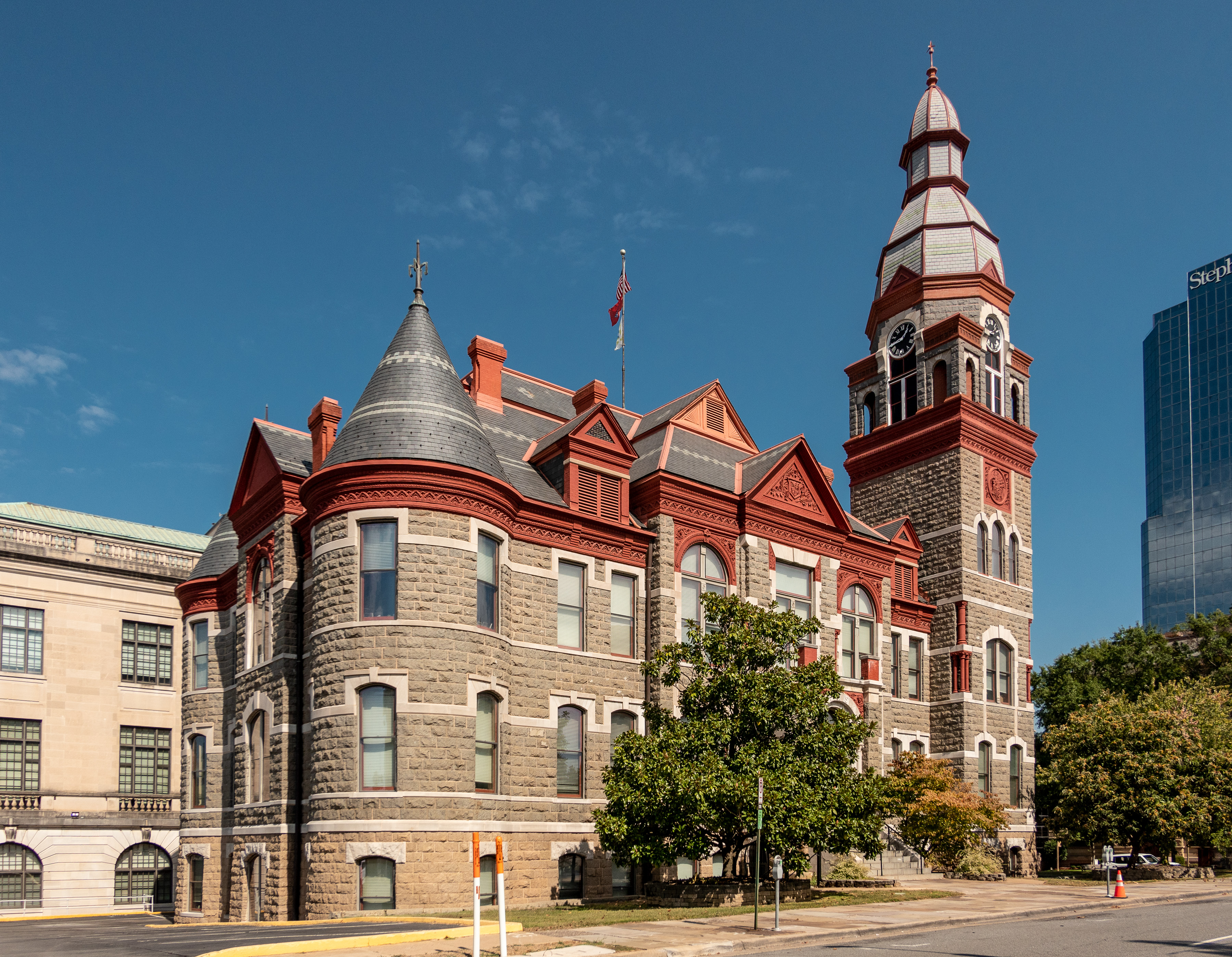
Pulaski County Courthouse, built in 1887

The city has operated under the city manager form of government since November 1957. In 1993, voters approved changes from seven at-large city directors (who rotated the position of mayor among themselves) to a popularly elected mayor, seven ward directors and three at-large directors. The position of mayor remained a part-time position until August 2007. At that point, voters approved making the mayor's position a full-time position with veto power, while a vice mayor is selected by and among members of the city board. The current mayor, elected in November 2018, is Frank Scott Jr., a former assistant bank executive, pastor and state highway commissioner.

The city manager is Delphone D. Hubbard.

The city employs over 2,500 people in 14 different departments, including the police department, the fire department, parks and recreation, and the zoo.

Most Pulaski County government offices are in Little Rock, including the Quorum, Circuit, District, and Juvenile Courts; and the Assessor, County Judge, County Attorney, and Public Defender's offices.

Both the United States District Court for the Eastern District of Arkansas and the United States Court of Appeals for the Eighth Circuit have judicial facilities in Little Rock. Emergency Response is provided by the Little Rock Police Department, Little Rock Fire Department, and Metropolitan Emergency Medical Service (MEMS)

== Education ==
=== Primary and secondary ===
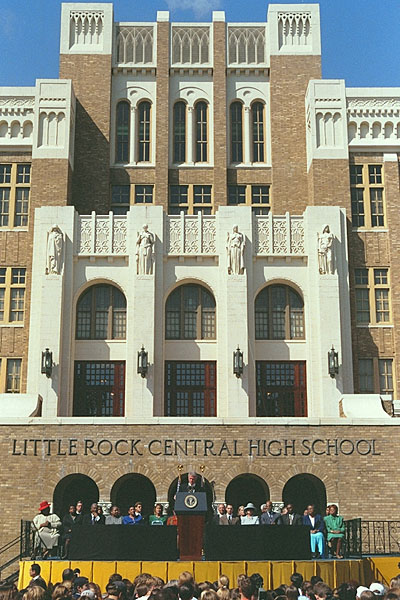
President Bill Clinton led celebrations of the 40th anniversary of desegregation at Little Rock Central High School.

The Little Rock School District (LRSD) includes the majority of Little Rock. As of 2012, the district has 64 schools with more schools being built. As of the 2009–2010 school year, the district's enrollment is 25,685. It has five high schools, eight middle schools, 31 elementary schools, one early childhood (pre-kindergarten) center, two alternative schools, one adult education center, one accelerated learning center, one career-technical center, and about 3,800 employees. The public high schools in Little Rock are Little Rock Central High School, Little Rock Southwest High School, Little Rock West High School, Hall STEAM Magnet High School and Parkview Arts and Science Magnet High School.

The Pulaski County Special School District (PCSSD) serves parts of Little Rock. The following PCSSD high schools, Mills University Studies High School and Joe T. Robinson High School, have Little Rock post office addresses, though they are outside of the city limits.

Little Rock is home to both the Arkansas School for the Blind (ASB) and the Arkansas School for the Deaf (ASD), which are state-run schools operated by the Board of Trustees of the ASB–ASD. In addition, eStem Public Charter High School and LISA Academy provide tuition-free public education as charter schools.

Various private schools are in Little Rock, such as: Arkansas Baptist School System, Central Arkansas Christian Schools, Episcopal Collegiate School, Little Rock Catholic High School, Little Rock Christian Academy, Mount Saint Mary Academy and Pulaski Academy. Little Rock's Catholic high school for African-Americans, St. Bartholomew High School, closed in 1964. The Catholic grade school St. Bartholomew School, also established for African-Americans, closed in 1974. The Our Lady of Good Counsel School closed in 2006.

=== Higher education ===
Little Rock is home to two universities that are part of the University of Arkansas System: the University of Arkansas at Little Rock and the University of Arkansas for Medical Sciences. UAMS consists of six colleges, seven institutes, several research centers, and the UAMS Medical Center.

A pair of smaller, historically black colleges, Arkansas Baptist College and Philander Smith College, affiliated with the United Methodist Church, are also in Little Rock. Located in downtown is the Clinton School of Public Service, a branch of the University of Arkansas System, which offers master's degrees in public service. Pulaski Technical College has two locations in Little Rock. The Pulaski Technical College Little Rock-South site houses programs in automotive technology, collision repair technology, commercial driver training, diesel technology, small engine repair technology and motorcycle/all-terrain vehicle repair technology. The Pulaski Technical College Culinary Arts and Hospitality Management Institute and The Finish Line Cafe are also in Little Rock-South. There is a Missionary Baptist Seminary in Little Rock associated with the American Baptist Association. The school began as Missionary Baptist College in Sheridan in Grant County.

=== Libraries ===
The Central Arkansas Library System comprises the main building downtown and numerous branches throughout the city, Jacksonville, Maumelle, Perryville, Sherwood and Wrightsville. The Pulaski County Law Library is at the William H. Bowen School of Law.

== Media ==
=== Print ===
The Arkansas Democrat Gazette is the largest newspaper in the city, as well as the state. As of March 31, 2006, Sunday circulation is 275,991 copies, while daily (Monday-Saturday) circulation is 180,662, according to the Audit Bureau of Circulations. The monthly magazine Arkansas Life, part of the newspaper's niche publications division, began publication in September 2008. From 2007 to 2015, the newspaper also published the free tabloid Sync Weekly. Beginning in 2020, the ADG ceased weekday publication of the newspaper and moved to an exclusive online version. The only physical newspaper the Democrat-Gazette now publishes is a Sunday edition.

The Daily Record provides daily legal and real estate news each weekday. Healthcare news covered by Healthcare Journal of Little Rock. Entertainment and political coverage is provided weekly in Arkansas Times. Business and economics news is published weekly in Arkansas Business. Entertainment, Political, Business, and Economics news is published Monthly in "Arkansas Talks".

In addition to area newspapers, the Little Rock market is served by a variety of magazines covering diverse interests. The publications are:

- At Home in Arkansas
- AY Magazine
- Inviting Arkansas
- Little Rock Family
- Little Rock Soiree
- RealLIVING

=== Television ===
Many television networks have local affiliates in Little Rock, in addition to numerous independent stations. As for cable TV services, Comcast has a monopoly over Little Rock and much of Pulaski County. Some suburbs have the option of having Comcast, Charter or other cable companies.

Television stations in the Little Rock area include:

Call letters	Number	Network
KETS/AETN	2	PBS
KETS-2	2.2	Create; Arkansas Information Reading Service (audio only, only on SAP; radio reading service)
KETS-3	2.3	PBS Kids
KETS-4	2.4	World
KARK	4	NBC
Laff	4.2	Laff
Grit	4.3	Grit
Antenna TV	4.4	Antenna TV
KATV	7	ABC
KATV-DT2	7.2	Comet TV
Charge!	7.3	Charge!
TBD	7.4	TBD
KTHV	11	CBS
THV2	11.2	Court TV
Justice	11.3	Justice Network
Quest	11.4	Quest (U.S. TV network)
Circle	11.5	Circle (TV network)
Twist	11.6	Twist
KLRT	16	Fox
	16.2	Escape
KVTN	25	VTN: Your Arkansas Christian Connection
KASN	38	The CW
KKAP	36	Daystar
KARZ	42	MyNetworkTV
	42.2	Bounce TV
	42.3	Ion Television
KMYA-DT	49.1	Me-TV

== Infrastructure ==
=== Transportation ===
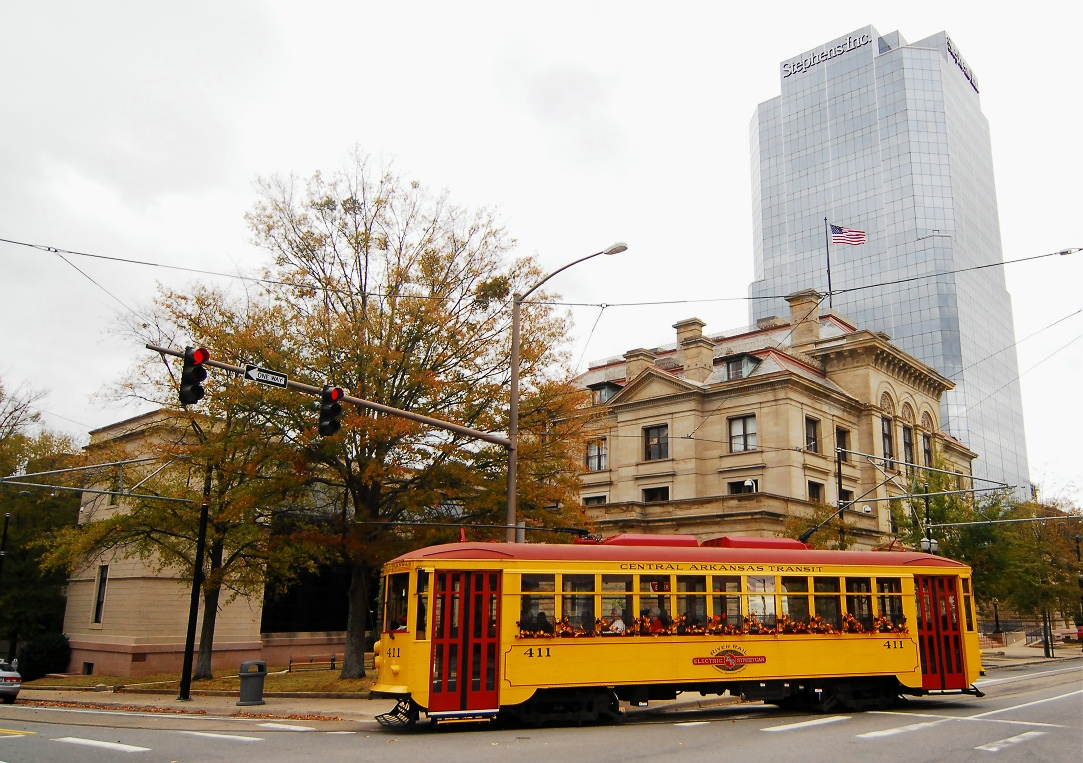
The Metro Streetcar heritage streetcar system

Three primary Interstate Highways and four auxiliary Interstates serve Little Rock. Interstate 40 (I-40) passes through North Little Rock to the north, and Interstate 30 in Arkansas enters the city from the south, ending at I-40 in the north of the Arkansas River. Interstate 57 runs northeast to Chicago with a small portion yet to be built. Shorter routes designed to accommodate the flow of urban traffic across town include I-430, which bypasses the city to the west,I-440, which serves the eastern part of Little Rock including Clinton National Airport, and I-630 which runs east–west through the city, connecting west Little Rock with the central business district. I-530 runs southeast to Pine Bluff as a spur route. U.S. Route 70 parallels I-40 into North Little Rock before multiplexing with I-30. US 67 and US 167 share the same route from the northeast before splitting. US 67 and US 70 multiplex with I-30 to the southwest. US 167 multiplexes with US 65 and I-530 to the southeast.

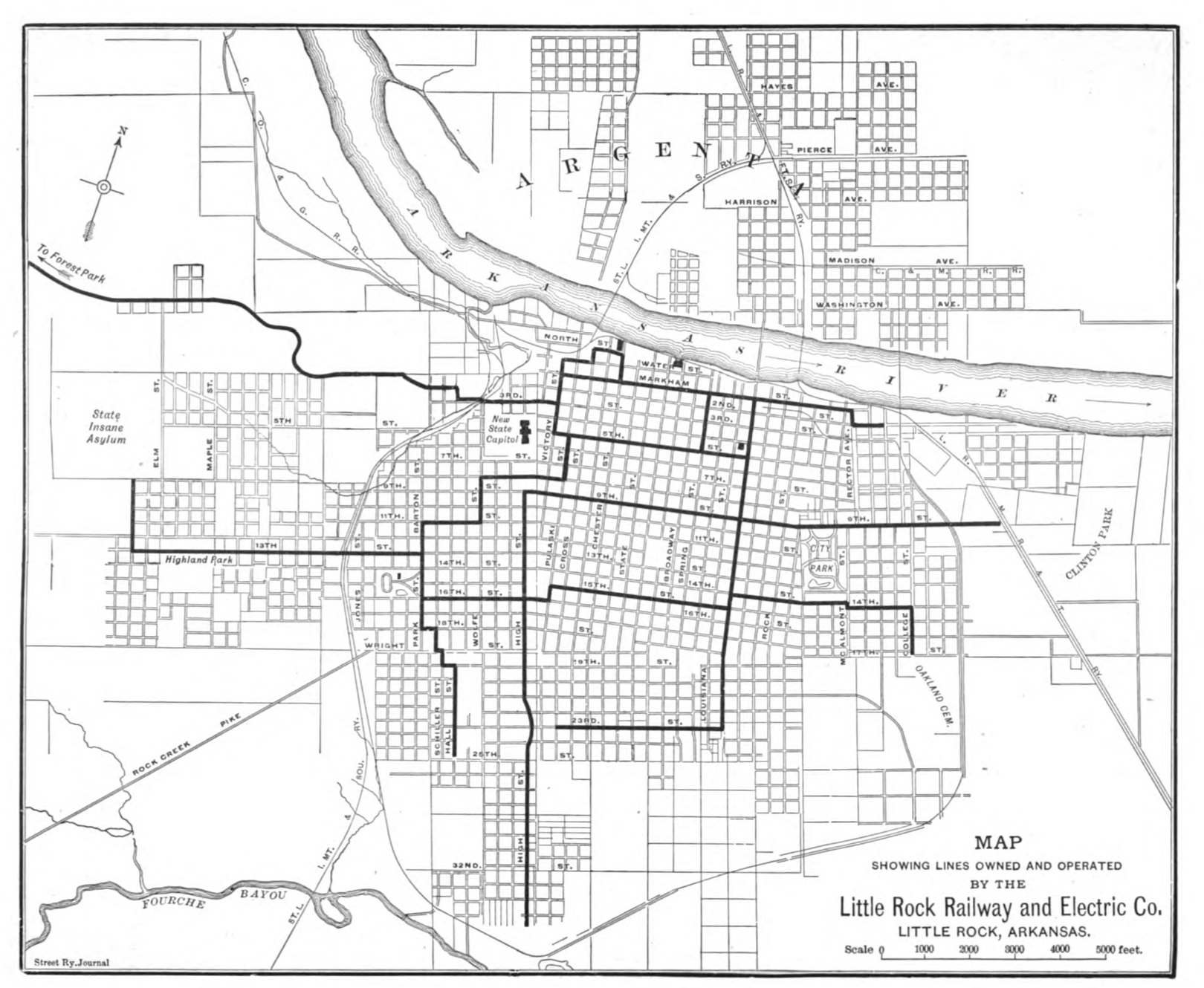
Map of Little Rock Railway and Electric Company c. 1907

Rock Region Metro, which until 2015 was named the Central Arkansas Transit Authority (CATA), provides public bus service within the city. As of January 2010, CATA operated 23 regular fixed routes, three express routes, as well as special events shuttle buses and paratransit service for disabled persons. Of the 23 fixed-route services, 16 offer daily service, six offer weekday service with limited service on Saturday, and one route runs exclusively on weekdays. The three express routes run on weekday mornings and afternoons. Since November 2004, Rock Region Metro's Metro Streetcar system (formerly the River Rail Electric Streetcar) has served downtown Little Rock and North Little Rock. The Streetcar is a 3.4-mile (5.5 km)-long heritage streetcar system that runs from the North Little Rock City Hall and throughout downtown Little Rock before it crosses over to the William J. Clinton Presidential Library. The streetcar line has 14 stops and a fleet of five cars with a daily ridership of around 350.

Greyhound Lines serves Dallas and Memphis, as well as intermediate points, with numerous connections to other cities and towns. Jefferson Lines serves Fort Smith, Kansas City, and Oklahoma City, as well as intermediate points, with numerous connections to other cities and towns. These carriers operate out of the North Little Rock bus station.

Amtrak serves the city twice daily via the Texas Eagle, with northbound service to Chicago and southbound service to San Antonio, as well as numerous intermediate points. Through service to Los Angeles and intermediate points operates three times a week. The train carries coaches, a sleeping car, a dining car, and a Sightseer Lounge car. Reservations are required.

Nine airlines, of which eight are passenger ones and one is a cargo one, serve many national gateway cities from Clinton National Airport. In 2006, airlines carried approximately 2.1 million passengers on approximately 116 daily flights to and from Little Rock.

==== Modal characteristics ====
According to the 2016 American Community Survey, 82.9% of working Little Rock residents commuted by driving alone, 8.9% carpooled, 1.1% used public transportation, and 1.8% walked. About 1.3% commuted by all other means of transportation, including taxi, bicycle, and motorcycle. About 4% worked out of the home.

In 2015, 8.2% of city of Little Rock households were without a car, which increased slightly to 8.9% in 2016. The national average was 8.7% in 2016. Little Rock averaged 1.58 cars per household in 2016, compared to a national average of 1.8 per household.

=== Healthcare ===
Hospitals in Little Rock include:

- Arkansas State Hospital – Psychiatric Division
- Arkansas Children's Hospital
- Arkansas Heart Hospital
- Baptist Health Medical Center
- Central Arkansas Veteran's Health care System (CAVHS)
- Pinnacle Pointe Hospital
- St. Vincent Health System
- UAMS Medical Center

=== Emergency services ===
The City of Little Rock and the surrounding area are serviced by Metropolitan Emergency Medical Services (MEMS), a public, non-profit, public utility model ambulance service.

In the early years of EMS, the city of Little Rock was serviced by multiple ambulance services. Subsequently, patient care was overshadowed by profit. A walk-out of one of the two services, Medic Vac, led to the creation of the Little Rock Ambulance Authority and MEMS in 1984.

== Sister cities ==
Little Rock's sister cities are:

- Kaohsiung, Taiwan (April 19, 1983)
- Hanam, Gyeonggi-do, South Korea (May 19, 1992)
- Changchun, Jilin, China (April 5, 1994)
- (United Kingdom) Newcastle upon Tyne, Tyne and Wear, England (November 20, 2016)
- Caxias do Sul, Rio Grande do Sul, Brazil (November 11, 2017)

== See also ==
- Arkansas statistical areas
- Baptist Missionary Association of America
- Jack Stephens Center
- List of capitals in the United States
- List of municipalities in Arkansas
- Little Rock Air Force Base
- Lucie's Place
- National Register of Historic Places listings in Little Rock, Arkansas
- USS Little Rock (CL-92)
- USS Little Rock (LCS-9)
