= South Main Street Apartments Historic District =

- U.S. National Register of Historic Places
- U.S. Historic district
- U.S. Historic district – Contributing property
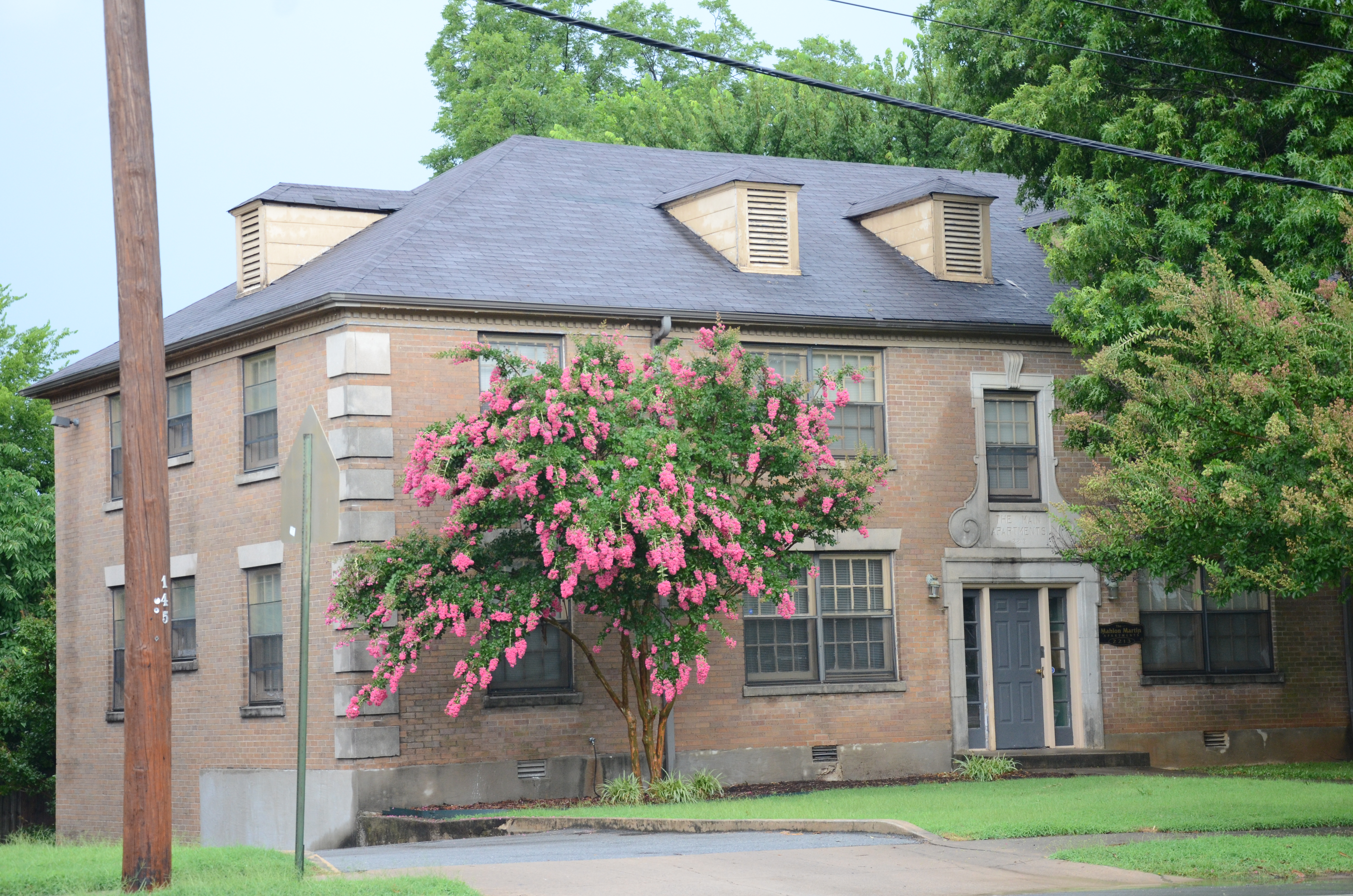

- Location within Arkansas Location within the United States
- Location: 2209-2213 Main St., Little Rock, Arkansas
- Coordinates: 34°43′37″N 92°16′24″W
- Area: 1 acre (0.40 ha)
- Built: 1941
- Architect: Bruggeman, Swaim & Allen; Witherspoon, Lawrence
- Architectural style: Colonial Revival
- Part of: South Main Street Residential Historic District (ID07000436)
- MPS: Little Rock Apartment Buildings MPS
- NRHP reference No.: 95000378

Significant dates
- Added to NRHP: April 7, 1995
- Designated CP: July 12, 2007

The South Main Street Apartments Historic District encompasses a pair of identical Colonial Revival apartment houses at 2209 and 2213 Main Street in Little Rock, Arkansas. Both are two-story four-unit buildings, finished in a brick veneer and topped by a dormered hip roof. They were built in 1941, and are among the first buildings in the city to be built with funding assistance from the Federal Housing Administration. They were designed by the Little Rock firm of Bruggeman, Swaim & Allen.

The district was listed on the National Register of Historic Places in 1995.

== See also ==
- National Register of Historic Places listings in Little Rock, Arkansas
