= Lucie's Place =

U.S. non-profit organization

Lucie's Place, Inc.
- New Lucie's Place logo, announced Sept 29, 2014
- Named after: Lucille Marie Hamilton
- Founder: Penelope Poppers; Diedra Levi
- Type: 501(c)(3) non-profit
- Tax ID no.: 45-3671770
- Purpose: Homeless LGBTQ Young Adults
- Location: Little Rock, Arkansas
- Region served: Central Arkansas
- Revenue: Community support Foundation
- Employees: 6
- Website: www.luciesplace.org

Lucie's Place is an organization in Little Rock, Arkansas, working to open a home for homeless, or at risk of becoming homeless LGBTQ young adults. Lucie's Place is named in memory of Lucille Marie Hamilton, a young transgender woman who died on July 11, 2009.

== History ==
Lucie's Place began as a project of the Living & Affected Corporation, an HIV/AIDS advocacy non-profit organization. In August 2011, a board of directors was formed and decided to begin the process of becoming a separate non-profit organization.

Lucie's Place incorporated on November 2, 2011, and received non-profit status June 27, 2012.

In 2018, Johnette Fitzjohn became the executive director of Lucie's Place.

== Programs ==
Lucie's Place Transitional Living Program (TLP) is a long-term home that provides emergency housing for both homeless (or at risk of becoming homeless) LGBTQ young adults (18–25) and other LGBTQ people who are kicked out of their own homes by their own biological families because of their own sexual orientations in Central Arkansas.Residents of the TLP place can both learn and develop all of the life skills necessary to move on to a life of full independence. The current home can also house up to eight young homeless adults too. Lucie's Place Drop-In Center also provides a safe place for community members who want to relax during the day. Services in this TLP place also provided at the drop-in center include case management and referrals to other programs in the area inside this TLP place. Members who live in this TLP place can also ease access to food, clothing, bathrooms, showers, laundry, bus passes, cell phones, and storage inside this TLP place too.

== Need ==
While LGBT individuals make up 5–10% of the general population, they represent 20–40% of the homeless population. These shelters are often affiliated with religious doctrine that opposes LGBT equality or believes that homosexuality, bisexuality, trans* and non-binary gender identity, and non-heterosexual and -cisgender identification is morally wrong and/or socially unacceptable.

Homeless shelters are often problematic for most LGBT individuals, as these shelters often do not have policies that specifically protect LGBT people.Homeless shelters are often especially troublesome for trans* individuals, as most residential programs require residents to stay in the dorm of the gender assigned to them at birth, not the gender with which they actually identify.

== #DefendTheDuggars ==
In August 2014, the Duggar family of TLC's 19 Kids and Counting donated $10,000 to help repeal an amendment to the Civil Rights ordinance in Fayetteville, Arkansas, that was inclusive of transgender people. A petition was begun to take 19 Kids and Counting off the air and the hashtag #DefendTheDuggars was created for individuals to show support of the Duggar family. LGBTQ and allied individuals in turn took that hashtag and turned it into a pro-LGBT hashtag. Writer Scott Wooledge then created a meme, stating "The Duggars spent $10,000 to fight for "the right" to fire gay people for who they love in Arkansas. On an operating budget of just over $7,500 Lucie's Place ministers to the LGBTQ homeless youth population of Arkansas. Which cause would Jesus support?"

This original was retweeted several times and went viral. Lucie's Place began to see a great increase in donations and then the #DoubleTheDuggars campaign began. To date Lucie's Place has received $24,000 in response to the original $10,000 donation the Duggars made. The story was picked up by the Arkansas Times, Bilerico and Dan Savage's "Slog".
