= Quapaw Quarter =

Coordinates: 34°44′04″N 92°16′23″W

The Quapaw Quarter of Little Rock, Arkansas, United States, is a section of the city including its oldest and most historic business and residential neighborhoods. The area's name was first given in 1961, honoring the Quapaw Indians who lived in the area centuries ago.

As many as fifteen separate National Historic Register Districts make up the Quapaw Quarter, including more than 200 separate homes and buildings on the National Register of Historic Places. Trapnall Hall, along East Capitol Avenue, was among the first of the homes built in 1843 as the home of early state legislator Frederic Trapnall and his wife, Martha. Structures housing businesses on Main Street and Broadway south of Interstate 630 are also among this group.

Throughout the Quapaw Quarter, many small and large homes from the Antebellum and Victorian eras can be found, in addition to several examples of Craftsman-style architecture. Scott, Center, and Spring streets, in particular, are where many such homes stand today. The exterior of the Villa Marre, one such home, was known nationally as the outside of the home containing the office of Sugarbaker Designs, the fictional Atlanta-based interior design firm on the CBS sitcom Designing Women. The actual home is along Little Rock's Scott Street, and has been a former home for the office of the Quapaw Quarter Association, the chief organization that sponsors historic preservation efforts in the area.

== Notable Quapaw Quarter neighborhoods ==
=== Governor's Mansion District ===
Along with the Villa Marre, the exterior of the Arkansas Governor's Mansion was also featured on Designing Women, shown as the home of Suzanne Sugarbaker. The mansion and its grounds comprise a city block, dividing Center Street in its 1800-numbered block, and anchor the city's Governor's Mansion Historic District, encompassing many homes and businesses along and around lower Broadway. The first official residence of Arkansas's governors opened on January 10, 1950, to a week-long open house for all Arkansans. The Georgian Colonial Revival home was renovated and expanded from 2000 through 2002, reopening for the inauguration of Mike Huckabee's second full term as Governor of Arkansas in early 2003.

=== MacArthur Park Historic District ===
The MacArthur Park Historic District, dedicated in 1981, adjoins the city's MacArthur Park along East 9th Street, including the Arkansas Arts Center, and the circa-1840 Tower Building of the Little Rock Arsenal. This building in the district contains the birthplace of General Douglas MacArthur, a foremost commander of American forces in the Pacific Theater during World War II.

=== South Main Residential Historic District ===
The South Main Residential Historic District — nicknamed SoMa by some area locals — was added to the National Register of Historic Places in 2007 according to the Department of Arkansas Heritage. The district, which runs along South Main Street between 19th and 24th streets, is notable for its assortment of quality late 19th and early 20th century residential architecture, including the Queen Anne, Craftsman, and Colonial Revival styles.

== Area landmarks ==
=== Mount Holly Cemetery ===
Another area landmark is Mount Holly Cemetery, at the intersection of 12th and Broadway streets, with one of the largest collections of gravesites of notable Arkansans, from past governors, senators, and mayors to Confederate spy David Owen Dodd and Arkansas Gazette founder William E. Woodruff. The cemetery dates from 1843, and is among the several locations throughout the Quapaw Quarter on the National Register of Historic Places.

=== Notable businesses ===
The edge of the Quapaw Quarter, near the downtown central business district, contains the headquarters of the Arkansas Democrat-Gazette, the state's largest newspaper, with roots in the Arkansas Gazette founded in 1819, and the Arkansas Democrat founded in 1878. Its headquarters are in a circa-1904 building at the intersection of East Capitol Avenue and Scott Street that formerly housed a branch of the YMCA. Boulevard Bread Company has an outlet on Main Street.
