= South Scott Street Historic District =

Historic district in Arkansas, United States

- U.S. National Register of Historic Places
- U.S. Historic district
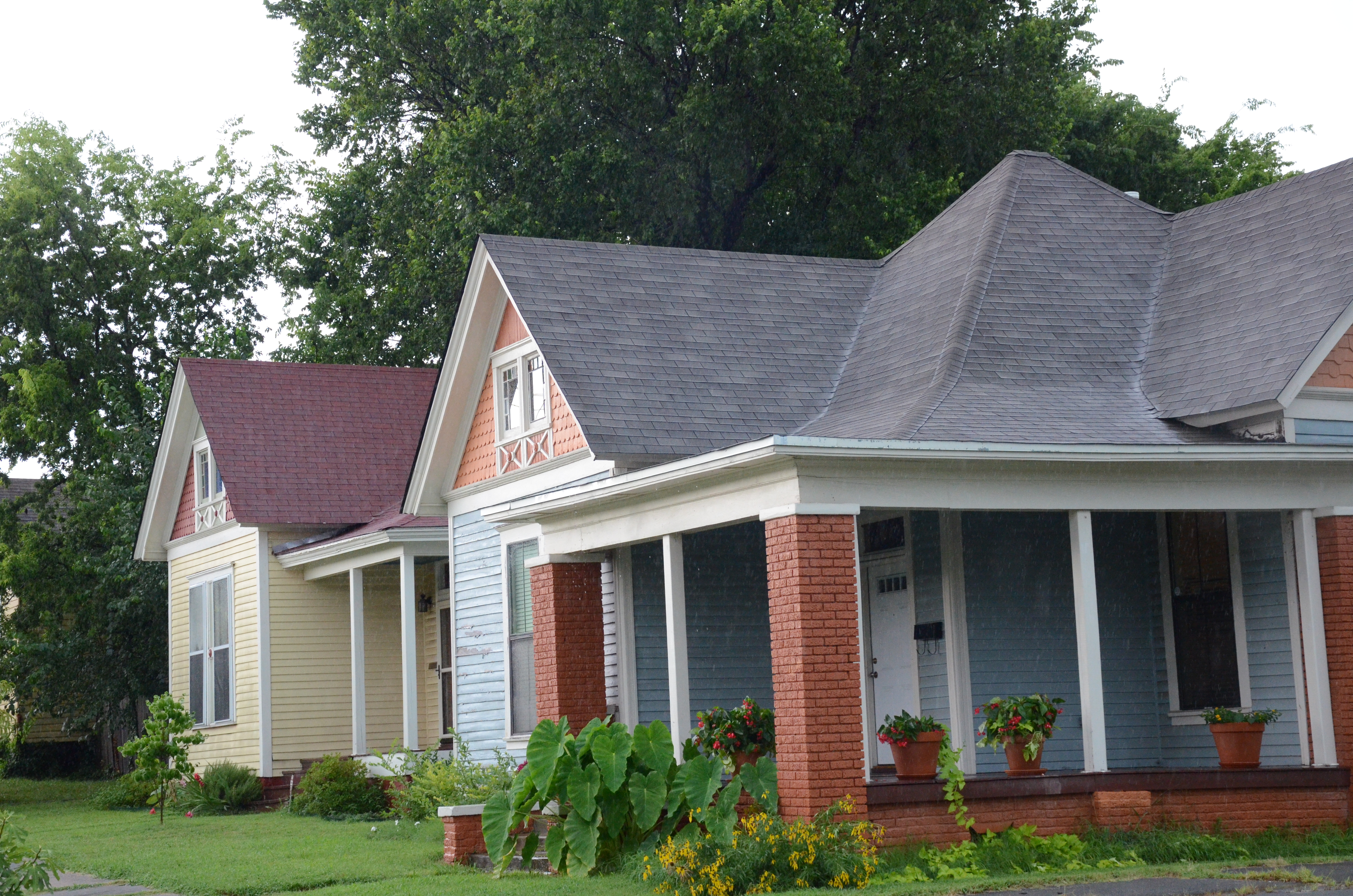

- Location within Arkansas Location within the United States
- Location: Roughly bounded by E. 24th, S. Scott, E. 25th, and South Main Sts., Little Rock, Arkansas
- Coordinates: 34°43′55″N 92°16′22″W
- Area: 6 acres (2.4 ha)
- Built: 1885
- Architectural style: Queen Anne, Italianate
- NRHP reference No.: 99001297
- Added to NRHP: November 12, 1999

The South Scott Street Historic District encompasses a small portion of a residential area south of downtown Little Rock, Arkansas. It includes the 2400 block of South Scott Street, and one block of 24th Street just to its west. Developed between about 1890 and 1950, this area has one of the city's best-preserved concentrations of modest middle-class residences from that period. It includes fourteen buildings, ranging stylistically from the Queen Anne to the post-World War II vernacular.

The district was listed on the National Register of Historic Places in 1999.

== See also ==
- National Register of Historic Places listings in Little Rock, Arkansas
