= Pleasant Valley (Little Rock) =

Neighborhood in Little Rock, Arkansas, US

Coordinates: 34°46′49″N 92°24′30″W

Pleasant Valley is a neighborhood that is among the older western neighborhoods of the city of Little Rock, Arkansas. The area is to the northwest of Breckenridge and west of Colony West. Pleasant Valley lies to the south of the hillier Pleasant Ridge and Walton Heights areas, and mostly to the east of St. Charles.

== Background ==
The neighborhood is centered on Pleasant Valley Country Club, which is ranked by Golf Digest as the 3rd best course in the state and 11th best by "Top 100 Golf Courses.com". Pleasant Valley is encompassed entirely by the 72212 zip code. The Average Adjusted Gross Income for 72212 in 2011 was $123,178 placing it in the 98th percentile nationally and the wealthiest in the City of Little Rock.

The neighborhood is served by the westernmost portion of Rodney Parham Road, named for an influential former Pulaski County judge, and landmarks such as Pleasant Valley Country Club, houses of worship including Pleasant Valley Church of Christ, First Baptist Church, St James Methodist and Temple B'nai Israel, and moderate to upscale retail and restaurants. Additionally, several real estate agencies and other professional service firms conduct business from headquarters or branch offices in the neighborhood. Rural telecom company Windstream Communications established its corporate headquarters in Pleasant Valley following its spinoff from Alltel. Much of the residential development of Pleasant Valley, evidence of Little Rock's continual westward expansion and migration, has stemmed from the late 1960s and early 1970s. A significant number of empty-nester dwellings in the neighborhood and large homes adjoining the country club were built following the creation of a partial interchange at Rodney Parham Road's intersection with Interstate 430 in 1970.
