= Broadmoor (Little Rock) =

Settlement in Little Rock, Arkansas

Coordinates: 34.7276°N 92.3464°W

The Broadmoor neighborhood is a subdivision in central Little Rock, Arkansas, located in the University District. It was developed west of Hayes Street on the western edge of the city beginning in 1953. Today, it is west of South University Avenue, southeast of Boyle Park Road, and north of West 32nd Street.

As of December 2021, the Broadmoor Neighborhood Historic District was under consideration for the National Register of Historic Places.

== History ==
A portion of the neighborhood lies on land occupied by the former hunting lodge of Raymond Rebsamen. A small lake near the lodge, Rebsamen Lake, was expanded in 1954 and is now known as Broadmoor Lake.

The Broadmoor Property Owners Association was formed on April 30, 1954, upon the petition of the developer, E.L. Fausett. On September 19, 1978, the City of Little Rock created the Broadmoor Recreational Improvement District Number Two of the City of Little Rock, Arkansas. City of Little Rock Ordinance Number 13,510. The District encompasses the entire Broadmoor Addition and has the authority to assess taxes on lots to finance improvements to common areas, such as the park, lake, and clubhouse.

Improvement of U.S. Highway 67 in the 1950s benefitted the Broadmoor neighborhood.
