= Arkansas River Trail =

Recreational rail trail in Arkansas, United States

Coordinates: 34°54′25.4″N 92°26′47.7″W

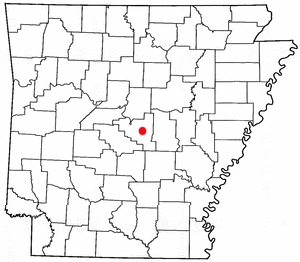
- Location of the Arkansas River Trail
- Length: 14 mi (23 km)
- Location: Pulaski County, Arkansas, USA
- Trailheads: Little Rock, Arkansas; North Little Rock, Arkansas
- Use: Hiking, Cycling, Jogging
- Elevation change: negligible
- Difficulty: Easy
- Season: All
- Sights: Arkansas River, Pinnacle Mountain, Big Rock, the Little Rock, William J. Clinton Presidential Center and Park, The Medical Mile, the Big Dam Bridge, North Little Rock's Burns Park

Arkansas River Trail

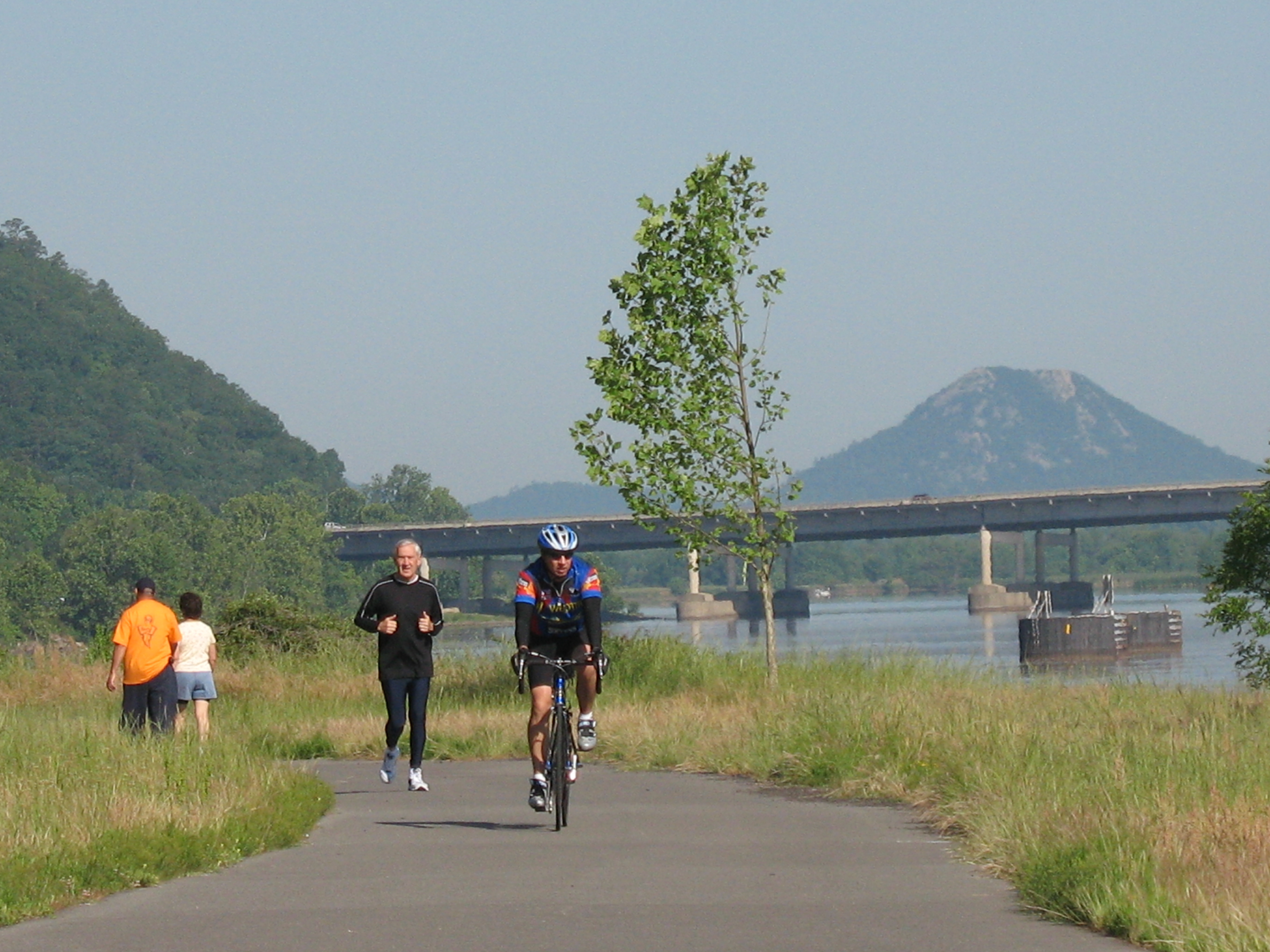
Arkansas River Trail west of Jimerson Creek footbridge; Pinnacle Mountain is in background

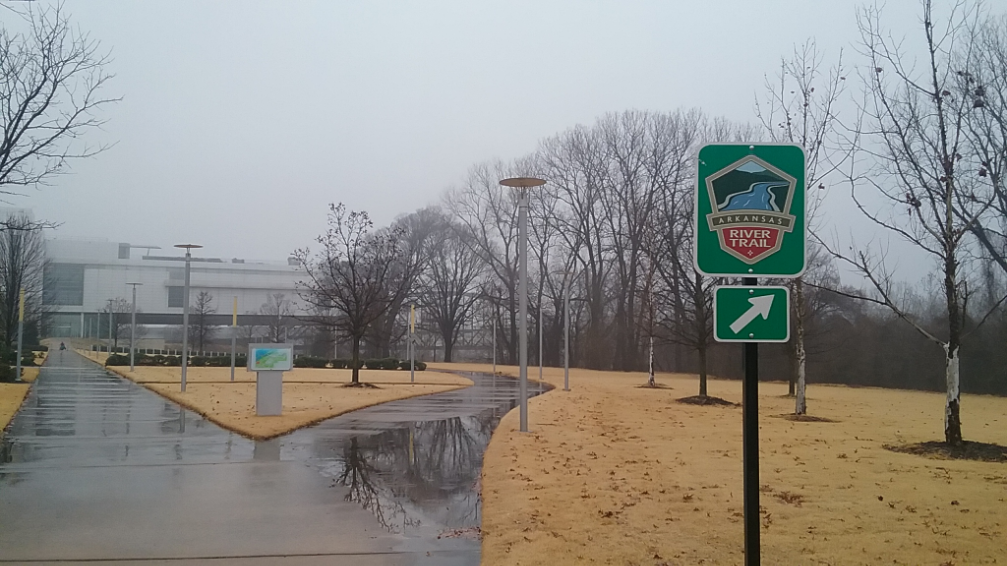
Southeast of the Clinton Presidential Center

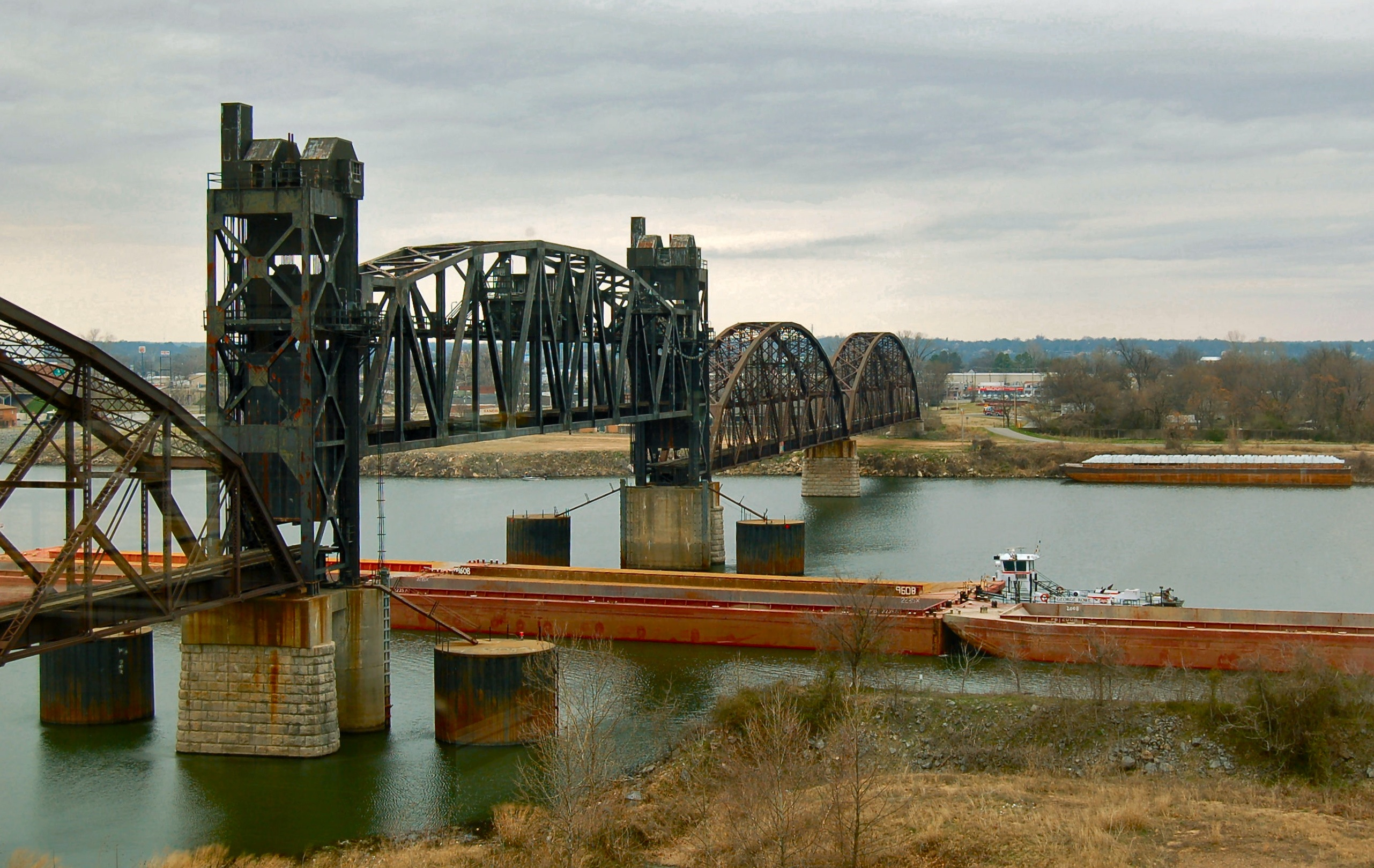
Rock Island railroad bridge in 2006

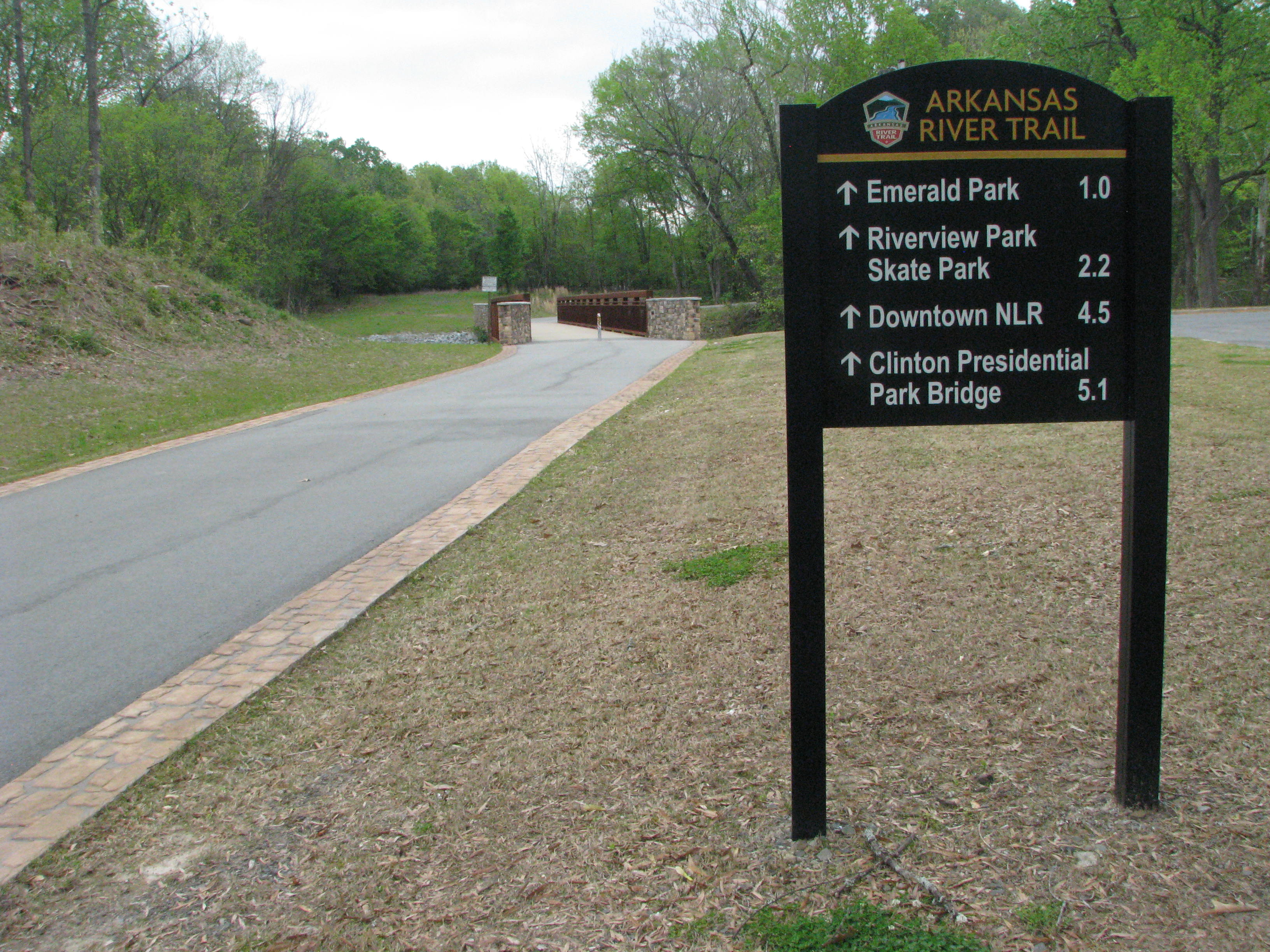
Burns Park

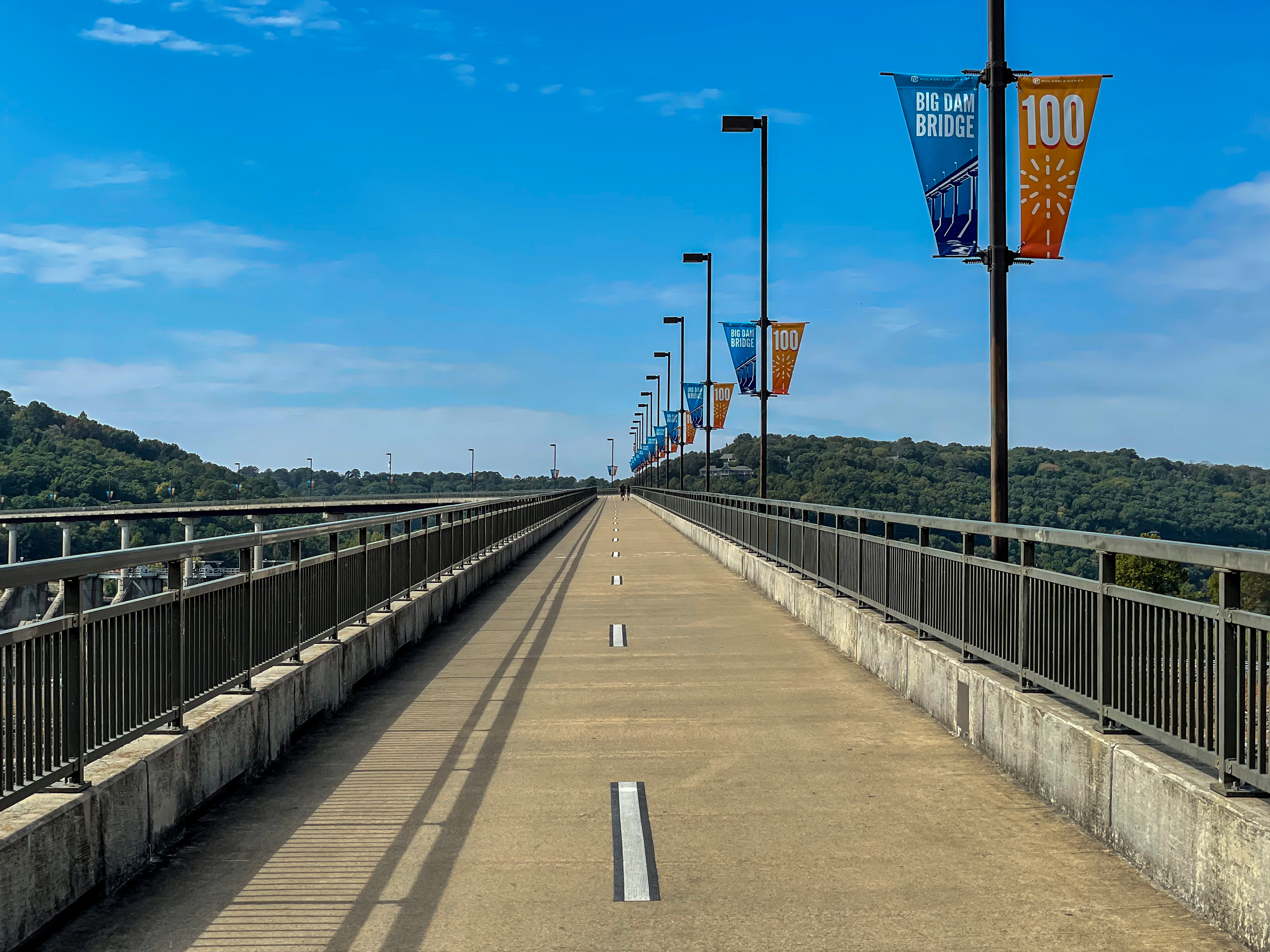
Big Dam Bridge

The Arkansas River Trail is a rail trail that runs 17 miles (27 km) in along both sides of the Arkansas River in Central Arkansas.

== History ==
The Arkansas River Trail began with funding from a $1.9 million bond issue from the city of Little Rock in 2003. The trail includes a portion of the Little Rock & Western Railway. The former railbed is still in use by the railroad and operates adjacent to the trail.

== Bridges ==
=== Junction and Clinton Presidential Park Bridges ===
Both former railroad bridges have been converted into pedestrian and bicycling bridges. The Junction Bridge opened in May 2008; the Clinton Presidential Park Bridge, named after former U.S. president Bill Clinton, opened in October 2011. Both connect the two cities' riverfront parks. The Junction Bridge is accessed via stairs and elevators.

The Junction Bridge was originally constructed in 1884 as a railroad bridge. As a pedestrian bridge, it is lit with hundreds of colored lights at night.

Renovation work on the Clinton Presidential Park Bridge began in May 2010. The railroad bridge, originally constructed in 1899 as the Rock Island Bridge, is the eastern pedestrian and bicycle connection for the River Trail.

Renovation work on the Clinton Presidential Park Bridge cost $10.5 million and was funded by a mix of funds including $4 million from the Clinton Foundation, $2.5 million of federal stimulus money, $2 million from the Commerce Department, $1 million from the city of Little Rock, and $750,000 from the city of North Little Rock.

=== Big Dam Bridge ===
At 4,226 feet long, the Big Dam Bridge is the longest pedestrian and bicycle bridge in North America which was built specifically for that use. It connects Little Rock with North Little Rock.

=== Baring Cross ===
Of the three railroad spans in the downtown area one is still in use by the Union Pacific Railroad (UP). UP gave tentative approval to build a small bridge near the Little Rock Amtrak station.
