= List of places named for Douglas MacArthur =

United States Army General Douglas MacArthur is remembered for his services in many places. Schools, roads and parks are among those that have been named in his honor. MacArthur was enormously popular with the American public, even after his defeat in the Philippines, and across the United States streets, public works, children and even a dance step were named for him during World War II as well. He was very popular with the people of the Philippines (he was the Field Marshal of the Philippine Army in the 1930s) who still consider him a national hero to the present day. There are monuments and historical markers all over the Philippines that memorialize almost every single location where MacArthur served in the Philippines from his first tour there in 1903 to 1961, his final farewell tour to the Philippines.

== Towns and places ==
- MacArthur, Leyte, Philippines
- General MacArthur, Eastern Samar, Philippines
- Bgy. MacArthur, Monreal, Masbate, Philippines
- MacArthur, West Virginia, United States

== Schools ==
- Douglas MacArthur High School (1950) in San Antonio, Texas, whose mascot is "The Mighty Brahmas" and is a part of the North East Independent School District, is named for MacArthur. It is also one of the oldest schools in the district.
- Douglas MacArthur High School in Levittown, New York was named after the general also.
- Douglas MacArthur Fundamental Intermediate School is located in Santa Ana, California; this was also named after the General.
- Douglas MacArthur Junior High School in Jonesboro, Arkansas. Their original mascot was "the Cadets".
- Douglas MacArthur Elementary School in Mesa, Arizona
- Douglas MacArthur Elementary School in Lakewood, California
- Douglas MacArthur Elementary School in Tulsa, Oklahoma
- Douglas MacArthur Elementary School in Albuquerque, New Mexico
- MacArthur Elementary School in Germantown, Wisconsin
- Irving, Texas is home to MacArthur High School, which is also on MacArthur Boulevard. The southern part of town is home to Nimitz High School.
- Houston, Texas is home to MacArthur High School as well as Nimitz High School and Eisenhower High School; all are located in the Aldine Independent School District.
- MacArthur Elementary-Intermediate School in El Paso, Texas is named after Douglas MacArthur. It is in the El Paso Independent School District.
- MacArthur High School in Lawton, Oklahoma.
- MacArthur Middle School on Fort George G. Meade army base in Fort Meade, Maryland.
- Macarthur High School in Decatur, Illinois.
- Douglas MacArthur Elementary School in Hoffman Estates, Illinois. Their mascot is "The Generals."
- Douglas MacArthur Elementary School in Waltham, Massachusetts.
- Douglas MacArthur Elementary School, Indianapolis, Indiana
- MacArthur Middle School, Berkeley, Illinois
- Douglas MacArthur Elementary School, 1101 Janneys Lane, Alexandria, Virginia.
- MacArthur K-8 University Academy, in Southfield, MI
- MacArthur Elementary School, Las Cruces, NM. The oldest elementary school in Las Cruces, NM. Established in 1954
- MacArthur High School, Washington, D.C.

== Roads and bridges ==
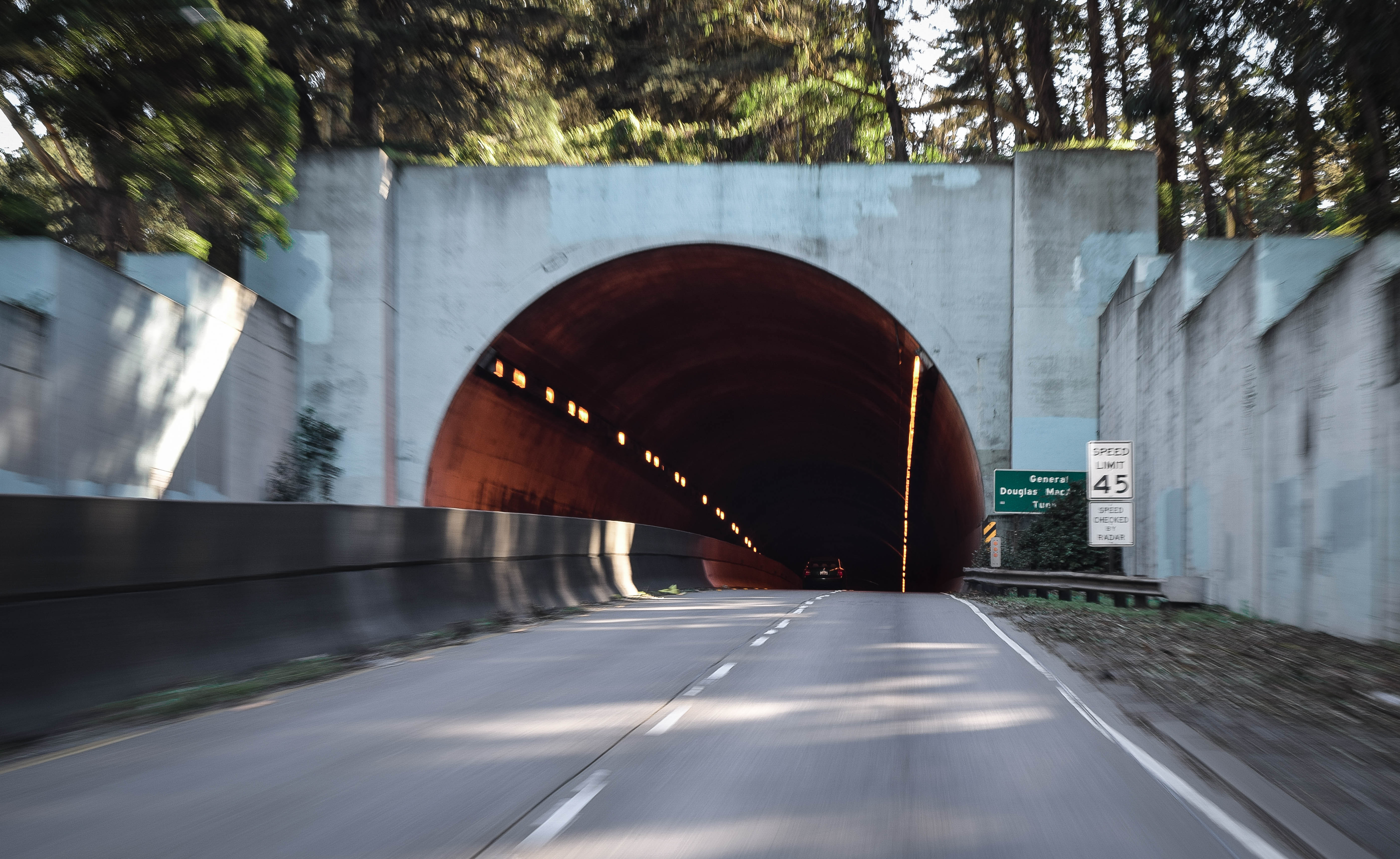
West entrance of the MacArthur Tunnel in San Francisco, California

- MacArthur Road in Trumbull, Connecticut
- MacArthur Road runs north of the Pershing Road intersection in Decatur, Illinois. South of Pershing Road, it becomes Monroe Street.
- MacArthur Road (Pennsylvania Route 145) in Whitehall Township, Pennsylvania.
- Douglas McArthur Drive in Starkville, Mississippi
- Douglas MacArthur Road in Albuquerque, New Mexico
- The MacArthur Bridge in Detroit, Michigan runs across the Detroit River to Belle Isle Park.
- There are two bridges and one road named after MacArthur in Taiwan, the MacArthur Highway (麥克阿瑟公路), becoming one of the only three foreigners who have had a landmark named after them, the other two being Franklin Roosevelt and George Leslie Mackay. The road is located in Taipei, although it is renamed now. The two bridges remain.
- MacArthur Boulevard is a major highway in Orange County, California. It runs east of the Santa Ana River to the Pacific Coast Highway in Newport Beach. This road is also the access to John Wayne Airport.
- Though there is a deviation in the spelling, McArthur Avenue in St. Louis, Missouri is named after General MacArthur. It runs from Goodfellow Boulevard to Darby Street.
- A street, MacArthur Boulevard, a section of Interstate 580 and a major freeway interchange in Oakland, California, are named after him. A local BART rapid transit station in Oakland is named after its location atop the street and in the freeway median. The MacArthur Tunnel, south of the Golden Gate Bridge on Highway 1 where it passes through the Presidio in San Francisco, is named after him.
- MacArthur Drive, is an 8-mile (13 km) long multilane bypass around the western side of Alexandria, Louisiana. Throughout, it bears US 71 and in places the additional road numbers for US 165, US 167, and LA 28. Until the 1992 closure of England Air Force Base, MacArthur Drive helped connect it with Camp Beauregard (now Louisiana National Guard Training Center Pineville), which lies northeast of Alexandria and is a major facility for the Louisiana National Guard.
- MacArthur Boulevard is a major street in the Algiers section of New Orleans, Louisiana.
- MacArthur Boulevard is a major street in Irving, Texas that runs north to Lewisville, Texas ending at Vista Ridge Mall through Valley Ranch and Las Colinas communities in Irving. It runs by North Lake College and Irving High School where it ends in Grand Prairie to the south.
- MacArthur Drive is a major thoroughfare in the northwestern part of North Little Rock, Arkansas, and is also known as Arkansas Highway 365.
- MacArthur Boulevard is a major highway in Oklahoma City, Oklahoma, and terminates at the Federal Aviation Administration training academy there.
- The MacArthur Causeway is a six lane highway that links downtown Miami, Florida with the city of Miami Beach. The roadway (State Road A1A) crosses the Biscayne Bay south of the Venetian Causeway and north of the Port of Miami.
- An 18-mile (29 km) section of Interstate 580 running between and though the cities of Oakland, California and Castro Valley, California was dedicated to the Great General upon its completion. It is commonly referred to as the "MacArthur Freeway."
- MacArthur Bridge in Manila, Philippines runs across the Pasig River.
- MacArthur Highway, a 500-kilometre (310 mi) section of the Manila North Road that spans from Caloocan, Metro Manila to Ilocos Norte in the Philippines.
- MacArthur Highway in Davao Region in Southern Philippines
- MacArthur Avenue, Munster, Indiana, USA
- MacArthur Boulevard is a major thoroughfare in Springfield, Illinois.
- MacArthur Avenue, Fort Devens, Massachusetts
- Avenida General MacArthur, Vila Lageado, São Paulo, Brazil
- General MacArthur Street, Asunción, Paraguay
- Douglas Street, Santa Fe, New Mexico
- General Douglas MacArthur Plaza in New York City is a one-block-long street located to the west of the FDR Drive on the north side of the Headquarters of the United Nations.
- General Douglas MacArthur Road, Wolmido, Incheon, South Korea.
- MacArthur Boulevard is part of Massachusetts Route 28 from Falmouth. To Bourne at the Bourne Bridge. 1 of 2 bridges connecting Cape Cod to the rest of Massachusetts.

== Others ==
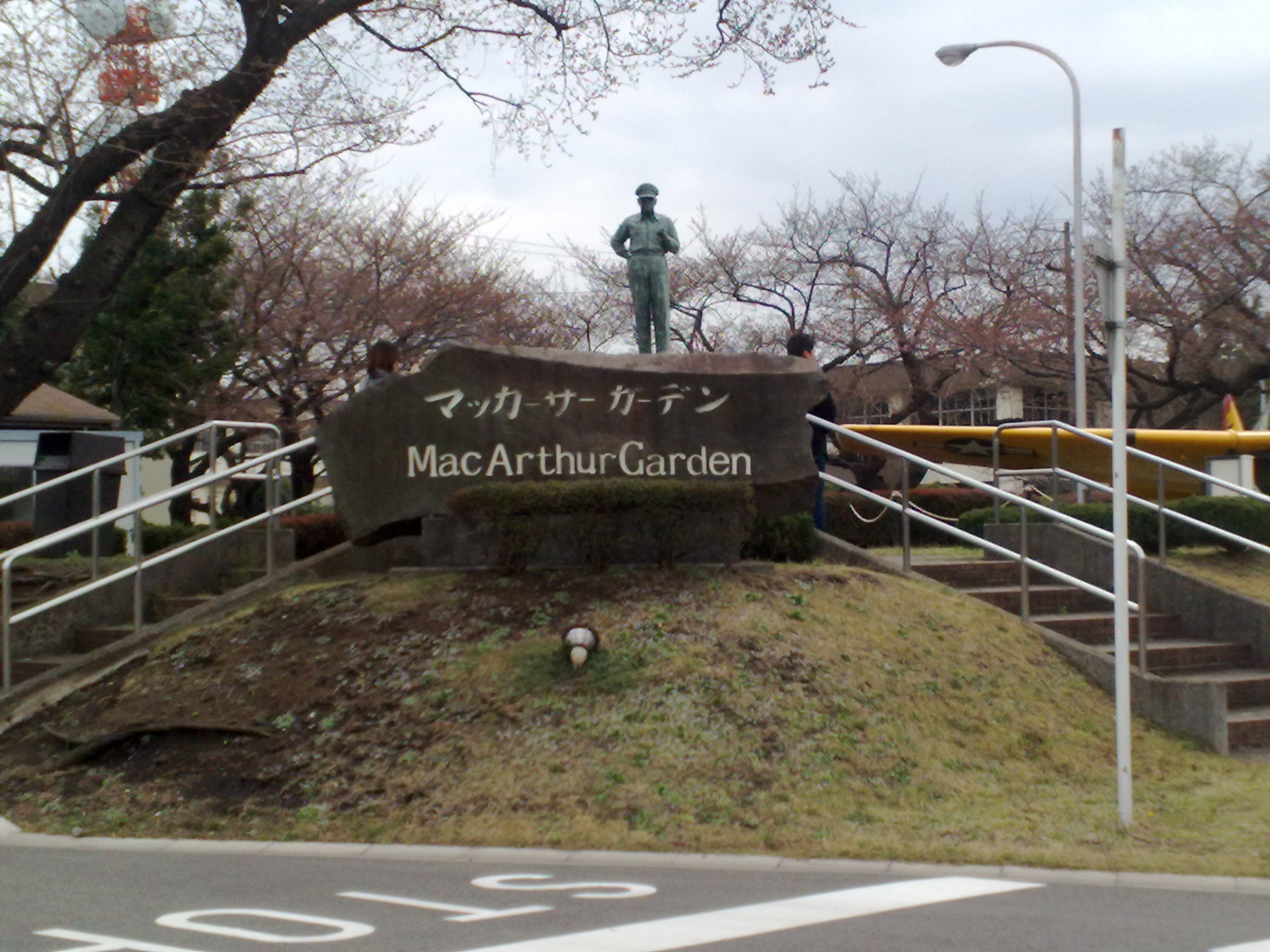
MacArthur Garden at Atsugi Naval Air Base, Japan

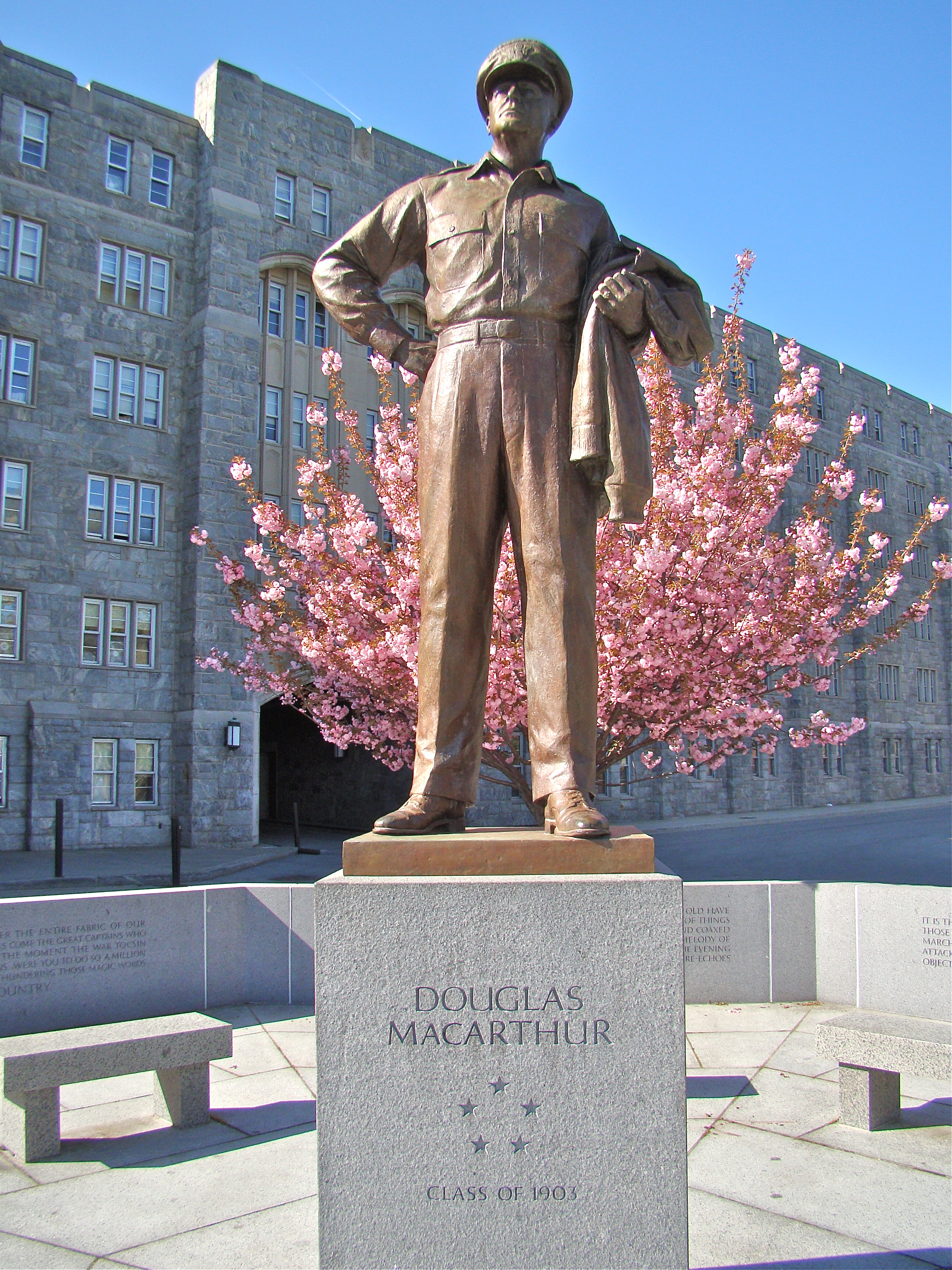
MacArthur statue at the United States Military Academy, West Point, New York

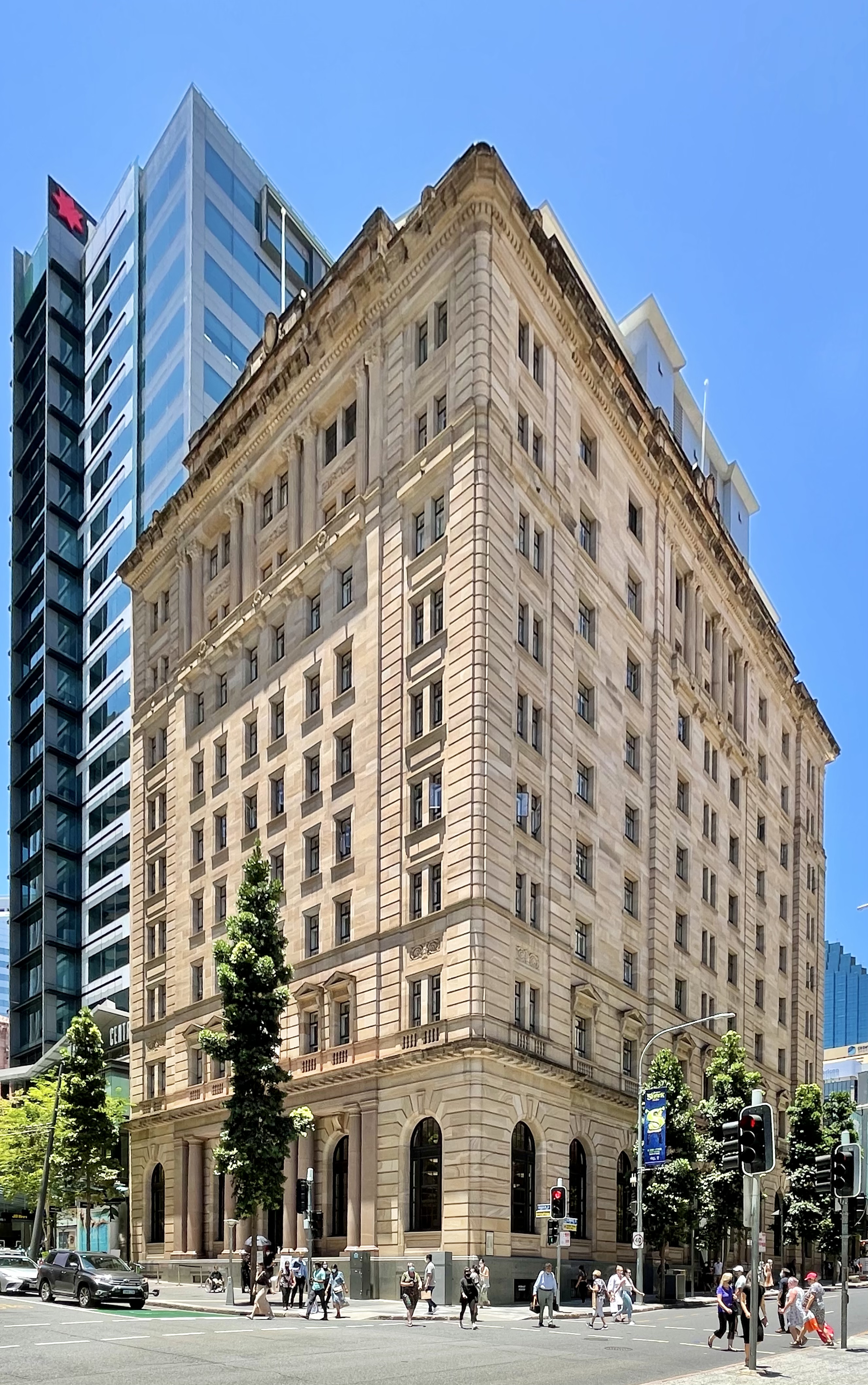
MacArthur Chambers, Brisbane, Australia

- The Douglas MacArthur Academy of Freedom, an extension of Howard Payne University in Brownwood, Texas, is named for the general. It has a life-size statue of MacArthur in front of the building. Douglas MacArthur's Medal of Honor is on permanent display in the MacArthur Gallery, along with a collection of MacArthur's effects, including swords from the Philippines and Japan, a collection of his pipes, and other personal belongings.
- MacArthur Park (formerly Westlake Park) is a park in Los Angeles, California, named after General Douglas MacArthur and designated city of Los Angeles Historic Cultural Monument #100. It is located in the Westlake neighborhood of the city and is named after General MacArthur. The park was also the basis of the song of the same name written by Jimmy Webb.
- MacArthur Park Historic District in Little Rock, Arkansas. The district's namesake park includes the Tower Building of the Little Rock Arsenal, where Douglas MacArthur was born. The Tower Building is the home of the MacArthur Museum of Arkansas Military History.
- Long Island MacArthur Airport, which is located in Islip, New York.
- A major upscale shopping mall, MacArthur Center, is named for Douglas MacArthur and is located across the street from the MacArthur memorial and burial site in Norfolk, Virginia.
- MacArthur Barracks at the United States Military Academy at West Point, adjacent to the MacArthur Statue.
- MacArthur Square is a commons area located to the east of the Milwaukee County Courthouse in Milwaukee, Wisconsin.
- MacArthur Inn, an historic hotel circa 1940, in Narrows, Virginia.
- MacArthur Landing Memorial is situated in Red Beach, Palo, Leyte in the Philippines. The monument, created by sculptor Anastacio Caedo, marks the spot where General Douglas MacArthur landed with the American Liberation Forces in October, 1944 starting the Battle of Leyte.
- MacArthur Hotel and Resort in Red Beach, Palo Leyte in the Philippines just beside the MacArthur Landing Memorial.
- The three-bedroom MacArthur Suite of the Manila Hotel was the residence of Gen. MacArthur while living in the country. The suite is located at the 5th floor of the original structure.
- Douglas MacArthur Memorial is situated at Tondaligan Blue Beach, Dagupan, Philippines to commemorate the January 1945 Lingayen Gulf landings. There has been a statue of MacArthur here since the 1980s that was commissioned by a private citizen on his or her private property. Access to this site is currently restricted most of the time. The Dagupan city government will take possession of this memorial at a future date, most likely when the city-built MacArthur Landing Park's statues are completed.
- MacArthur Landing Park (under construction) at Tondaligan Blue Beach, Dagupan, Philippines also memorializes the January 1945 Lingayen Gulf landings. This is about 1.5 kilometers to the east of the privately owned MacArthur statue in Dagupan and it is the site that is the closest to where MacArthur actually landed in Dagupan. This second Dagupan memorial to MacArthur is currently being constructed by the Dagupan city government and will eventually install statues of MacArthur and his staff landing on the beach that will look similar to the famous MacArthur Landing Memorial statues in Leyte.
- MacArthur Landing Memorial Park (under planning and construction) at Blue Beach, Lingayen, Philippines is planned to be built to honor the January 1945 Lingayen Gulf landings. MacArthur landed at both Lingayen and Dagupan (and, as a result, there is a long-running dispute over where he landed first) so both cities have planned recently to honor MacArthur in separate memorials. There is currently a very small, plain marker that signifies the MacArthur landing at Veterans Memorial Park near the Pangasinan Provincial Capitol in Lingayen.
- The MacArthur Memorial Room in the Dai-Ichi Building in Tokyo, Japan was established in honor of MacArthur's tenure as Supreme Commander for the Allied Powers during the occupation of Japan. Everything in the room has been kept the exact same as when MacArthur worked there from 1945-51.
- MacArthur Garden and MacArthur Statue in Atsugi Naval Air Base, Japan memorializing the August 1945 landing by MacArthur in Japan. This event started the occupation of Japan.
- The large MacArthur Central plaza in downtown Brisbane, Queensland, Australia, is named after Douglas MacArthur and has as its logo the five stars of his rank. The MacArthur Museum MacArthur Museum, Brisbane, which was opened to the public in 2004, is located within the MacArthur Central building, which was renamed MacArthur Chambers in honor of MacArthur.
- A monument to MacArthur in Landres-et-Saint-Georges, France was dedicated to honor his service with the 42nd Infantry "Rainbow" Division in World War I.
- The Douglas MacArthur Memorial Corridor in the Pentagon was dedicated by President Ronald Reagan in 1981 to honor MacArthur. The corridor displays uniforms, medals, and memorabilia from MacArthur's career. MacArthur is also honored in the Pentagon with a portrait in the U.S. Army Chief of Staff Memorial Corridor and his name is inscribed in the Hall of Heroes corridor that honors all Medal of Honor recipients.
- The MacArthur Room in the Lewis and Clark Center of the United States Army Command and General Staff College in Fort Leavenworth, Kansas was dedicated in honor of MacArthur who served at Fort Leavenworth as a junior officer. A portrait of MacArthur and a General of the Army flag have been placed behind a desk that was formerly used by MacArthur. It is a meeting room for visitors.
- A portion of the Gadjah Mada University INCULS library in Sleman, Special Region of Yogyakarta, Indonesia has been set aside as "The Douglas MacArthur Memorial Library for Peace, Tolerance, and Justice." Started in August 2006, the library receives book donations each year from students participating in the United States - Indonesia Society's Summer Studies program. One of the books, Cryptonomicon, features MacArthur as a supporting character.
- Gen. MacArthur Memorial Marker is a historical marker located at the edge of the Port of Macabalan Wharf in Cagayan de Oro, Philippines; the monument commemorates two historical events.
- A statue of MacArthur built in Jayu (Freedom) Park, in Incheon, South Korea in 1957 has become a site of contention between some civic groups who consider the statue a symbol of imperialism, should be removed, and some veteran groups who consider him a hero and symbol of all Korean and UN forces who died. Skirmishes between the two groups have forced the Korean government to protect the statue with troops. In November 2006, a MacArthur Statue protest leader was arrested.
- MacArthur Stadium was a former sports complex in Syracuse, New York from 1934 to 1997. It was primarily used by the Syracuse Chiefs for minor league baseball. The stadium was renamed in honor of MacArthur in 1942 and kept that name until its demolition in 1997.
- MacArthur Monument at the former location of the headquarters and lodging of MacArthur in Jayapura, Papua, Indonesia. The hill where the monument is located is called MacArthur hill (Bukit MacArthur) or, in locals spelling, Makatur hill (Bukit Makatur).
- Giant letter signs off the coast of Zum-zum island in Morotai Islands, North Maluku, Indonesia reads "Zum-zum Mc.Arthur Island" [sic], as General MacArthur once stayed in the island during Battle of Morotai and the island is also commonly called MacArthur island. A statue and bust of MacArthur are also present.
- MacArthur's Wharf is located in Buenavista, Guimaras that links Iloilo, Panay with Guimaras. The wharf was constructed by MacArthur and U.S. Army engineers in 1903 when he was a lieutenant and recently finished graduating from West Point. The area near the wharf where he was gathering some wood was where MacArthur was shot at by a group of Filipino brigands or guerrillas, almost killing him and actually shooting his hat off, and he shot two of them dead with his pistol.
- The Nimitz-MacArthur Pacific Command Center is located in Camp H. M. Smith in Oahu, Hawaii. It is the headquarters of the United States Indo-Pacific Command.
- The MacArthur is a historical Art Deco building in Los Angeles, California next to MacArthur Park. It was originally built to be the headquarters for the local Elks Lodge branch and then later was converted into a hotel. After the closure of the hotel in the 1980s the building was used in numerous Hollywood films and music videos. In the 2010s it was renamed The MacArthur.
- MacArthur Playground is a public park in New York City located between East 48th and 49th streets in Manhattan.
- The new Leyte Provincial Capitol (completed in 2022) in Palo, Leyte, Philippines has two statues of MacArthur. One statue is a smaller version of MacArthur and his party landing in Leyte like the larger famous MacArthur Landing Memorial National Park and the other is a statue of MacArthur together with Jesus Christ and Ferdinand Magellan.
- The MacArthur Conference Room in Yokota Air Base in Western Tokyo, Japan was dedicated in honor of MacArthur who served as Supreme Commander for the Allied Powers in Japan from 1945 to 1951. Yokota Air Base is the headquarters of United States Forces Japan. A bust of MacArthur and photos of MacArthur decorate the room.
