= MacArthur Memorial (disambiguation) =

The MacArthur Memorial a memorial and museum about the life of U.S. General Douglas MacArthur, located in Norfolk, Virginia, United States.

MacArthur Memorial may also refer to:

- MacArthur Memorial Marker, a shrine dedicated to US General Douglas MacArthur in Cagayan de Oro, Philippines
- MacArthur Landing Memorial National Park, a protected area of the Philippines that commemorates the historic landing of General Douglas MacArthur in Leyte Gulf
