= Frederick Hanger House =

Historic house in Arkansas, United States

- U.S. National Register of Historic Places
- U.S. Historic district – Contributing property
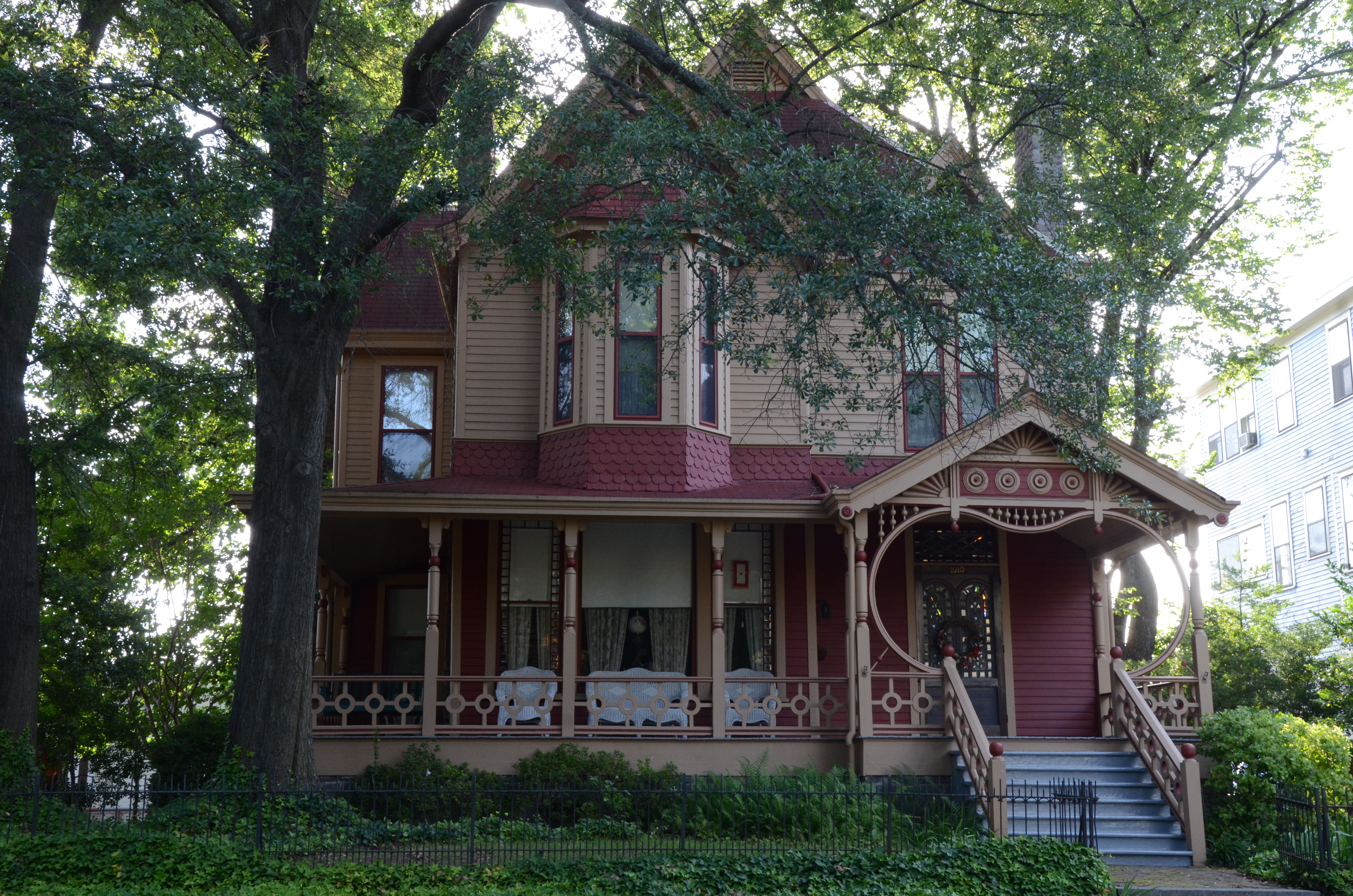

- Location within Arkansas Location within the United States
- Location: 1010 Scott St., Little Rock, Arkansas
- Coordinates: 34°44′18″N 92°16′30″W
- Area: less than one acre
- Built: 1889
- Architectural style: Queen Anne
- Part of: MacArthur Park Historic District (ID77000269)
- NRHP reference No.: 74000496

Significant dates
- Added to NRHP: March 15, 1974
- Designated CP: July 25, 1977

The Frederick Hanger House is a historic house at 1010 Scott Street in Little Rock, Arkansas. It is a two-story wood-frame structure, with complex massing and exterior typical of the Queen Anne style. It is topped by a gable-on-hip roof, from which numerous gables project, including two to the front, and has walls sheathed in clapboards and bands of decorative cut shingles. A porch extends across the front, supported by turned posts, with a balustrade of wooden circles joined by posts to each other and the supporting posts. It was built in 1889 for one of Little Rock's most prominent businessmen of the period, and is a particularly little-altered example of the Queen Anne style in the city.

The house was listed on the National Register of Historic Places in 1974.

== See also ==
- National Register of Historic Places listings in Little Rock, Arkansas
