= South Florida Chamber Maps =

Print and digital map company

South Florida Chamber Maps is a Broward County, Florida print and digital map company. Started in 2011, the company first printed humorous cartoon style maps that showed fun, local things to do in specific Broward County towns and cities including Weston, Coral Springs, Plantation, Pompano Beach, Lauderdale-By-The-Sea and Deerfield Beach. The guides are produced in collaboration with each city's chamber of commerce in order to lend credibility and accuracy to the projects. The maps are considered to be an important part of the northern Broward communities efforts to build regional tourism.

In 2013, the company began to create digital maps, interactive on-line versions with links directly to the map participants. The interactive maps led to the development of local websites for each of three Northern Broward County cities: PompanoFun.com, LBTSguide.com, and DeerfieldBeachFLA.com. The sites and editor Jeff Levine are becoming respected as top information sources for local things to do in these communities. Levine's blogs regularly are included on the hypesoutflorida blog, which is produced by the Sun-Sentinel, Fort Lauderdale and Broward County's largest circulating newspaper.

Levine is the President of South Florida Chamber Maps. His varied multi-media career includes stints as Program Director of WBAB/WHFM< and WLIR/WDRE/WXXP radio stations on Long Island, NY. He later moved to Broward County and was VP/Marketing at the Sun-Sentinel, and eventually was in charge of Sun-Sentinel.com and OrlandoSentinel.com websites as a Vice President for Tribune Interactive.

Levine was recently named 2014 Broward County Small Business Person of the Year for Pompano Beach at a ceremony held by the Broward County Council of Chambers due to his work in building tourism in the area. He has served on the board of directors of the United Way of Broward County, Hispanic Unity of Florida and the Museum of Discovery and Science in Fort Lauderdale.
