= Museum of Discovery =

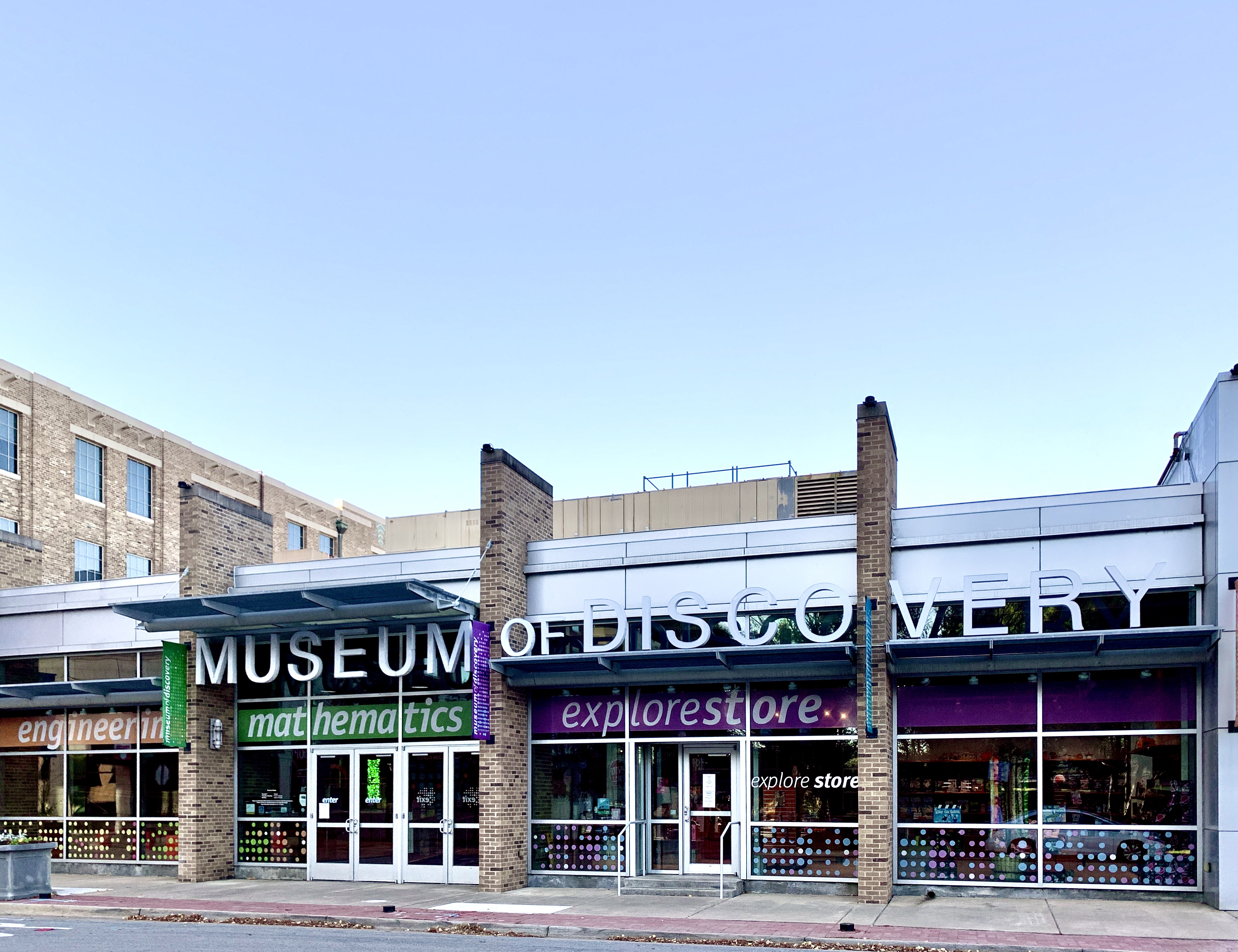
- Exterior view of entrance, November 2020
- Established: 1927
- Location: 500 President Clinton Ave., Suite 150; Little Rock, Arkansas
- Coordinates: 34°44′51″N 92°15′56″W
- Type: Science museum
- Website: museumofdiscovery.org

The Museum of Discovery, formerly the Arkansas Museum of Natural History and Antiquities, is located in downtown Little Rock, Arkansas. The museum is housed in a historic building in the River Market District on the Arkansas River. The museum has a focus on STEM education, and all of the exhibits are interactive. It features a record-breaking musical bi-polar tesla coil, and also includes a large live animal collection.

== History ==
Prolific writer and prohibitionist, Bernie Babcock, established the Arkansas Museum of Natural History and Antiquities in 1927 in response to criticism from H.L. Mencken that Arkansans were "bumpkins" who lacked cultural centers. Babcock first opened her museum in a downtown storefront on Main Street. Her museum had several sensational exhibits, such as the supposed head of a Chicago criminal and the King Crowley, now considered the greatest archaeological fake in Arkansas history. Her collection also included taxidermy specimens from other museums, "primitive art," and multicultural dolls. To secure the continued existence of her museum, Babcock gave the museum to the city of Little Rock as a Christmas gift in 1929 and it then moved to city hall. In 1942, the Tower Building of the Little Rock Arsenal was renovated due to the efforts of the Aesthetic Club, Little Rock philanthropist Frederick W. Allsop, and the Works Progress Administration. It would become the new home of The Arkansas Museum of Natural History and Antiquities, and remain there for some fifty-five years.

The museum continued to grow and acquire more and better artifacts and exhibits. The museum was one of three state organizations to receive a mold of the Arkansaurus fridayi fossil - "The Arkansas Dinosaur" - and also had a statue of it. It became the Museum of Science and Natural History in 1964, and the Arkansas Museum of Science and History in 1983. The increasing professionalism of the staff and museum led to accreditation from the American Alliance of Museums in 1993.

In 1997–98, the museum became the Museum of Discovery: Arkansas' Museum of Science and History, relocating to the River Market. The Children's Museum of Arkansas, located in Union Station merged with the Museum of Discovery in 2003. In 2008 the Donald W. Reynolds Foundation awarded a $9.2 million grant to the Museum of Discovery in Little Rock for expansion and renovations. These would include three new interactive exhibits and, construction of a new entrance from Clinton Avenue (the entrance was from the lobby of the Museum Center, an office building that had a number of other tenants including the museum).

Following renovations, the Museum of Discovery reopened in January 2012 with a new focus of STEM (science, technology, engineering, math) education.

The Museum of Discovery's former visitor experience director, Kevin Delaney, used to perform science experiments for visitors, and created the "Science After Dark" program for adults. In 2017 he started performing on the Science Channel, and subsequently became The Tonight Show Starring Jimmy Fallon's science expert.

On July 4, 2015, the Museum of Discovery debuted a Guinness World Record musical bi-polar tesla coil. The device was built by Goodchild Engineering in Arizona and was donated to the Museum of Discovery by Richard Mathias, founder and president of Tesla Coil Museum Exhibit Program, LLC, through a matching grant program from the General Electric Foundation.

In April 2019, the Museum of Discovery partnered with a local silicone manufacturer to create a brightly colored hands-on display to benefit children in Arkansas on the autism spectrum.

In February 2021, a water pipe burst, flooding and damaging much of the museum. The museum was closed for major repairs and reopened on August 21, 2021.

== Description ==
The museum is housed in a historic building in the River Market District on the Arkansas River. The Clinton Presidential Center is within walking distance.

It is focused on STEM education. All of the exhibits are interactive and the museum features a large live animal collection.

The musical bi-polar tesla coil – named after its inventor Nikola Tesla, the developer of the alternating current system of electricity used today – is a device that creates high-voltage electricity at a high frequency visible to the eye. The Museum of Discovery's coil emits electrical discharges to a variety of songs and shares the record for the world's largest bi-polar tesla coil with the coil at the Hands On! Regional Museum in Johnson City, Tennessee. The device can produce 200,000 volts of electricity.

== See also ==
- MOD., Adelaide, South Australia
- Museum of Discovery and Science, Fort Lauderdale, Florida
