= MacArthur Park Beach Resort =

Hotel in Leyte, Philippines

General information
- Status: Completed
- Location: Palo, Leyte, Philippines
- Opening: 1983
- Demolished: 2009
- Cost: ₱100 million

Other information
- Number of rooms: 43

The MacArthur Park Beach Resort was a resort hotel in the town of Palo in Leyte, Philippines. It was built by then-First Lady Imelda Marcos, the wife of president Ferdinand Marcos, although the hotel was run privately. It was seized by the Philippine government in 1986 and later demolished in 2009 to make way for a new hotel, The Oriental Leyte which opened in 2012.

== History ==
The MacArthur Park Beach Resort was built in 1983, by then-First Lady Imelda Marcos. Although the hotel was built during the presidency of Ferdinand Marcos, the hotel was not formally managed under a government body and was instead ran by a private firm known as the Island Corporation.

The hotel was sequestered by the succeeding Philippine government after the People Power Revolution of 1985 resulted the overthrow of President Marcos. In 1994, the hotel was placed under the management of the Philippine Tourism Authority (PTA).

On October 2, 2008, then-President Gloria Macapagal Arroyo issued Executive Order 756 which began the process of transferring the hotel's management to the provincial government of Leyte. The move was in response to a request of then-Leyte governor Jericho Petilla The Leyte provincial government took over the hotel in January 2009.

The Leyte government leased the associated property to the LKY Resorts and Hotel under a 25-year build, operate and transfer lease agreement in the same year. The MacArthur Park Hotel was demolished and a new hotel, The Oriental Leyte was built in its place. The new hotel operated from 2012 to 2024.

== Facilities ==
The MacArthur Park Beach Resort had 43 rooms and was built on a 3 hectares (7.4 acres) lot owned by the Leyte provincial government. In 2008, the hotel had 50 regular employees and 3 casual employees
