= MacArthur Landing Memorial National Park =

National park in Leyte, Philippines

- MacArthur's Landing, by Anastacio Caedo

- Location within Philippines
- Location: Palo, Philippines
- Nearest city: Tacloban, Leyte
- Coordinates: 11°10′20″N 125°00′44″E
- Area: 6.78 hectares (16.8 acres)
- Established: July 12, 1977
- Governing body: Department of Environment and Natural Resources

The MacArthur Leyte Landing Memorial National Park (also known as the Leyte Landing Memorial Park and MacArthur Park) is a protected area of the Philippines that commemorates the historic landing of General Douglas MacArthur in Leyte Gulf at the start of the campaign to recapture and liberate the Philippines from Japanese occupation on 20 October 1944. This event led to the largest naval battle of World War II (Also the world's largest naval battle in terms of gross tonnage sunk) and Japan's eventual defeat and surrender after almost three years. The war memorial is located in the municipality of Palo on Leyte island in Eastern Visayas and is one of the region's major tourist attractions. It was declared a national park on 12 July 1977 through Letter of Instructions No. 572 signed by President Ferdinand Marcos.

== Description ==
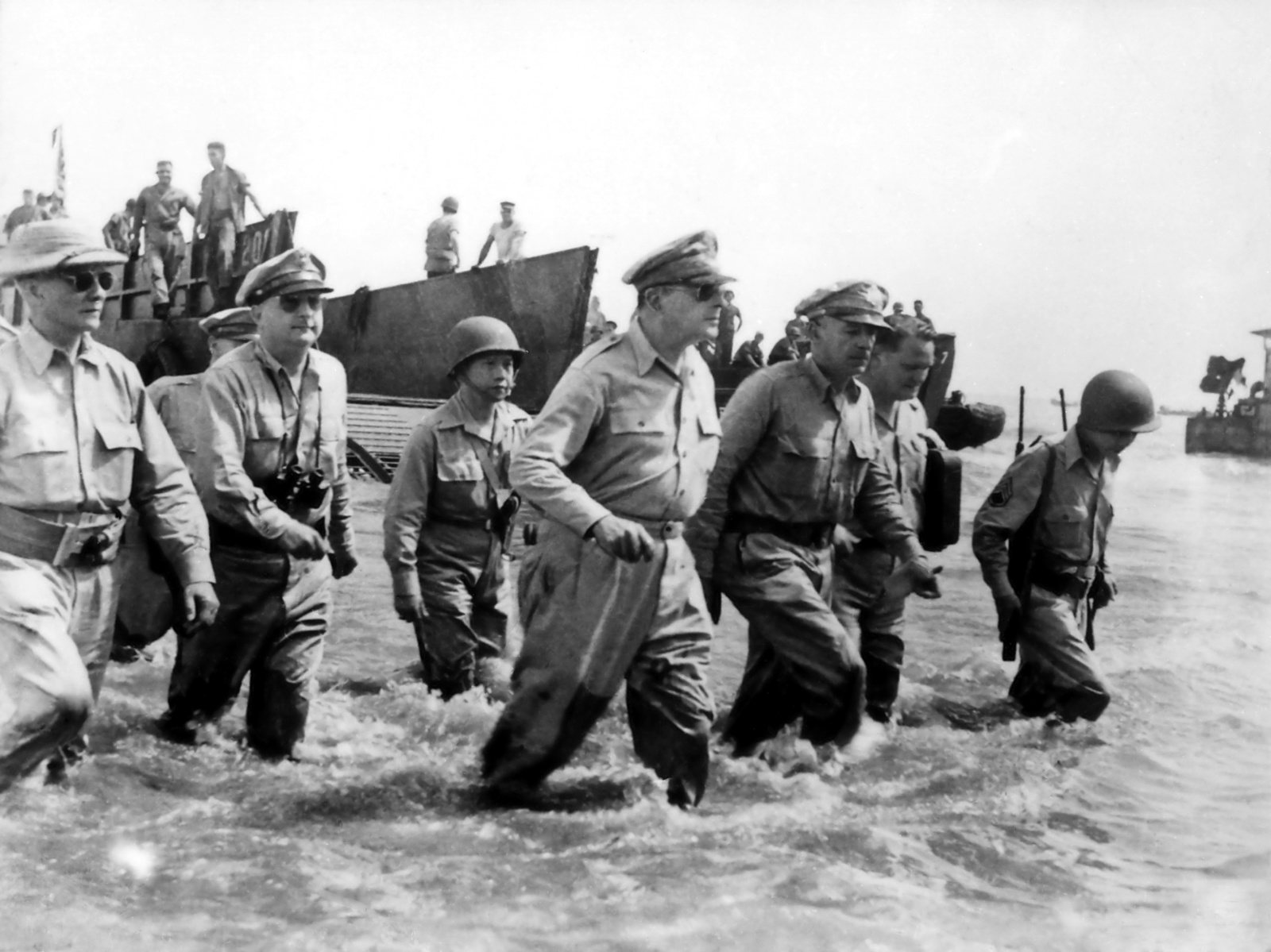
The photograph by Gaetano Faillace that served as the basis for the statues.

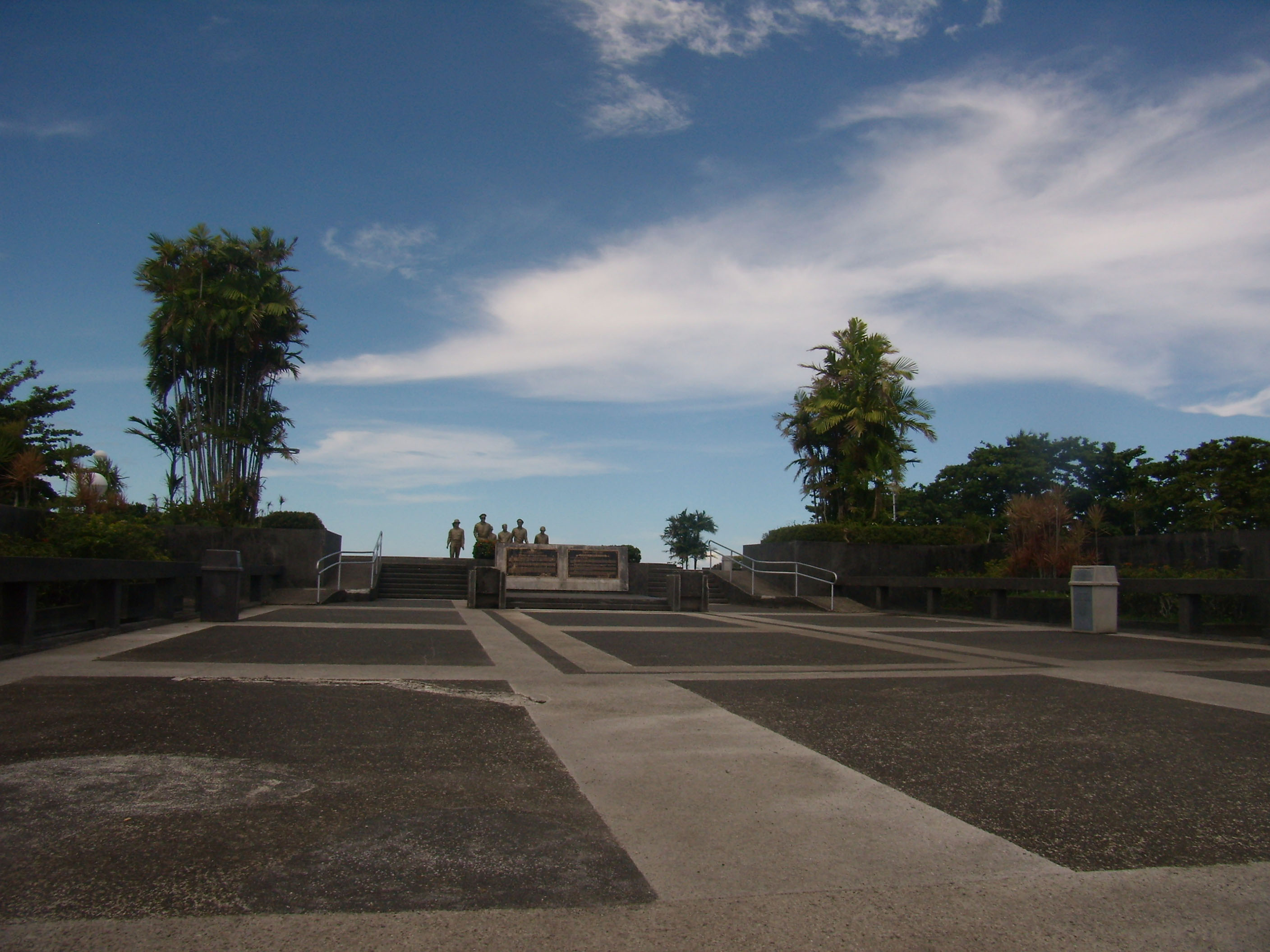
The national park.

The MacArthur Landing site sits on a 6.78-hectare (16.8-acre) coastal plain in the barangay of Candahug, some 5 kilometres (3.1 mi) south of Leyte's provincial capital Tacloban. It was formerly named Imelda Park after former First Lady Imelda Marcos who hails from Leyte Province. The park's focal point are the seven double-life-sized bronze statues on a shallow manmade pool depicting MacArthur and his entourage during the historic A-Day Landing as captured in the iconic photo by Gaetano Faillace. They were President-in-exile Sergio Osmeña, Lieutenant General Richard Sutherland, Brigadier General Carlos P. Romulo, Major General Courtney Whitney, Sergeant Francisco Salveron, aide and orderly to Gen. MacArthur, and CBS Radio correspondent William J. Dunn. (Note: The person identified as Francis Saveron in William Dunn's book Pacific Microphone is called in other sources like The New York Times and Filipinos in Washington, D.C. as Francisco Salveron.) Designed by sculptor Anastacio Caedo and inaugurated during the 37th anniversary of A-Day in 1981, the statues mark the spot where MacArthur fulfilled his promise of "I shall return" at Red Beach, so-called for the codename assigned by the US Sixth Army to the stretch of beach from Marasbaras to Palo that was designated as one of the landing areas. In front of the statues, two historical markers in English and Filipino can be found explaining the significance of the scene being depicted. A museum stands adjacent to the site which contains historic photographs and other memorabilia of General MacArthur including a copy of his speech upon landing and a bronze cast of his footprints.

Palo's regional government center is located right across from the memorial. Other notable structures nearby include the Rock Garden of Peace inaugurated during its 50th anniversary in 1994 when the memorial was also declared a national historic landmark by the National Historical Commission; and The Oriental Leyte. Another hotel, the MacArthur Park Beach Resort built by Imelda Marcos in 1983 used to be on the site of The Oriental Leyte hotel. The park is accessible via the Pan-Philippine Highway (AH26) from Tacloban and the Daniel Z. Romualdez Airport.

== Stories ==
The official story of October 20, 1944 was of MacArthur waiting and watching aboard the USS Nashville. The general was said to have waded in knee-deep waters as his craft grounded to a halt due to the shallow sea, sporadic fire from the enemy notwithstanding. There had been rumors that the landing photo had been staged as it was reported by the New York Times that Osmeña had landed on Leyte on October 21, one day after the reported MacArthur landing date. There were also the three photographs taken at varying angles of their landing, furthering the impression that everything had been rehearsed. In fact, there was no "staged photo op" at Leyte in October 1944 that resulted in the most famous photograph. The confusion was the result of MacArthur landing on three completely different beaches for four days in a row, where he talked to all the different frontline commanders at each beach, until he re-installed the Filipino government and firmly established headquarters on Filipino territory on October 23. Due to Japanese mortars and machine guns, the Leyte beach landing area was too risky for MacArthur to stay permanently until the fourth day. There were so many photos taken on those four days that confusion persists to the present day.

== Recent events ==
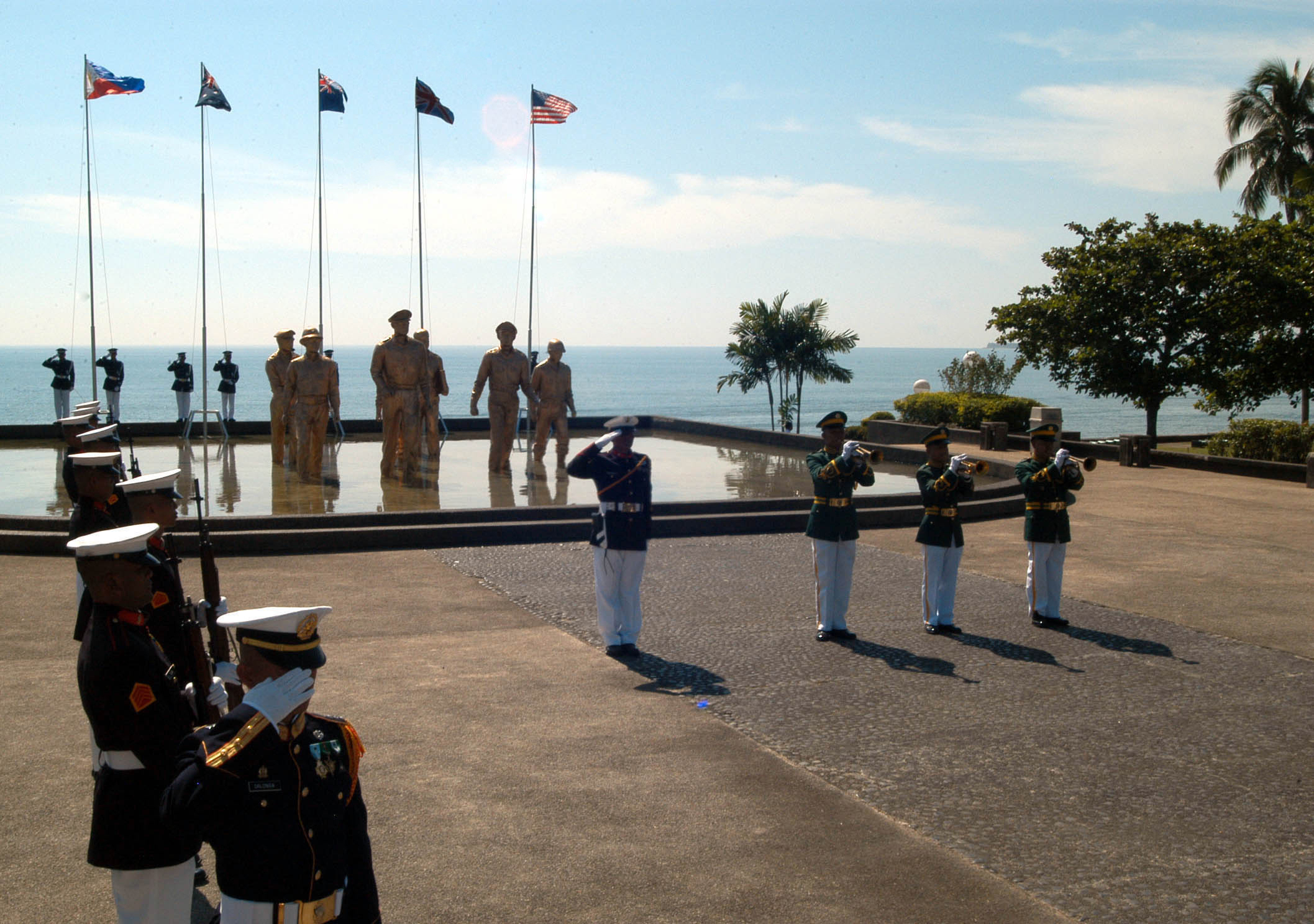
Philippine Marine Corps personnel honoring the Macarthur landing. 2004

The park is the site of the annual memorial rites and reenactment of the historic Leyte landing attended by local and foreign dignitaries together with war veterans and their families. On November 8, 2013, the memorial was damaged by Typhoon Haiyan (Yolanda) (The world's strongest recorded Supertyphoon) with one of its seven statues, the Carlos Romulo statue, knocked from its base. It was immediately repaired by the government and the statue of Carlos P. Romulo was restored within twenty days with assistance from the Metropolitan Manila Development Authority.
