= Tower Building of the Little Rock Arsenal =

Historic property and museum in Little Rock, Arkansas, U.S.

- U.S. National Register of Historic Places
- U.S. National Historic Landmark District – Contributing property
- U.S. Historic district – Contributing property
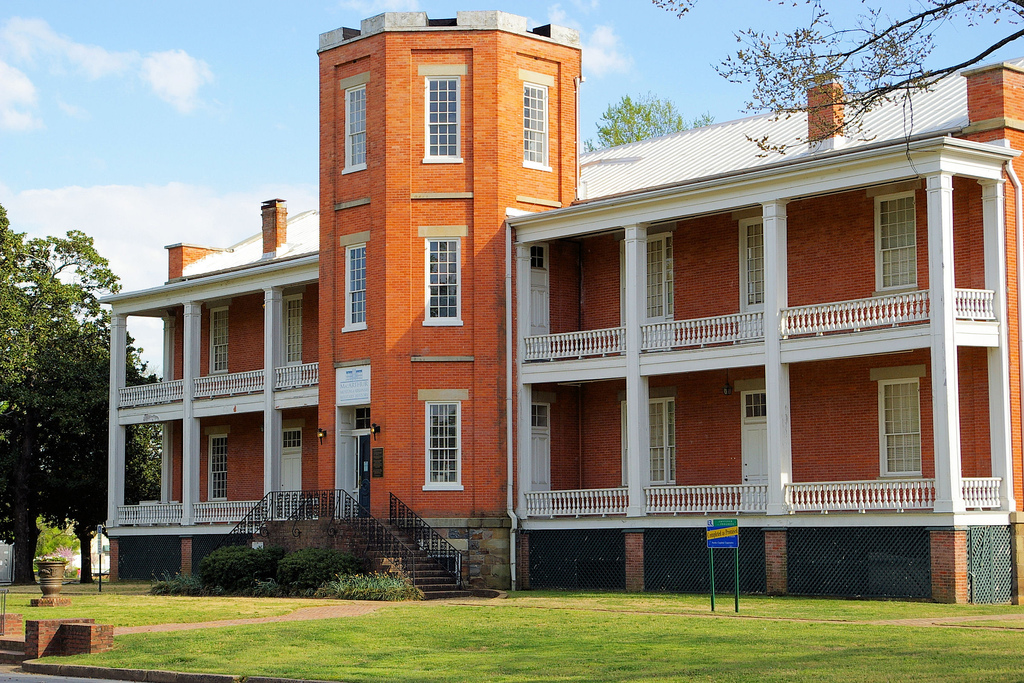
- Main façade of the Tower Building

- Location within Arkansas
- Location: 503 E. 9th St., Little Rock, Arkansas, U.S.
- Coordinates: 34°44′18.0″N 92°15′54.8″W
- Built: 1841
- Architect: John Warmley Walker
- Website: MacArthur Museum of Arkansas Military History
- Part of: Camden Expedition Sites (ID94001182); MacArthur Park Historic District (ID77000269)
- NRHP reference No.: 70000127

Significant dates
- Added to NRHP: July 28, 1970
- Designated NHLDCP: April 19, 1994
- Designated CP: July 25, 1977

The Tower Building of the Little Rock Arsenal, also known as the Main Building of the U.S. Arsenal at Little Rock, or Headquarters Building of the Little Rock Barracks, is the home of the MacArthur Museum of Arkansas Military History. It is also a part of the MacArthur Park Historic District, in Little Rock, Arkansas, United States.

Built between 1840 and 1841, it was part of Little Rock's first U.S. military installation. Since decommissioning, the building has housed two local museums. It was home to the Arkansas Museum of Natural History and Antiquities from 1942 to 1997 and the MacArthur Museum of Arkansas Military History since 2001. It has also housed the Little Rock Æsthetic Club since 1894. The building receives its name from its distinct octagonal tower. Besides being the last remaining structure of the original U.S. military installation and one of the oldest buildings in central Arkansas, it was also the birthplace of General Douglas MacArthur, who became the supreme commander of U.S. forces in the South Pacific during World War II. It was also the starting place of the Camden Expedition during the American Civil War.

== History ==
=== Background ===
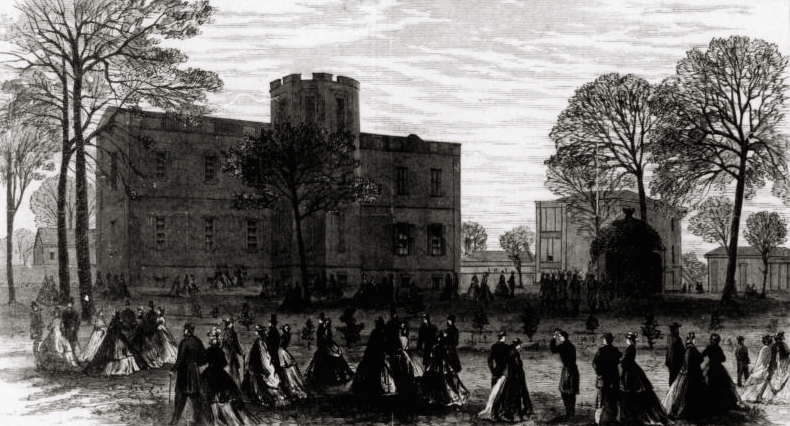
The Arsenal Grounds at Little Rock — Band of the Nineteenth Infantry, 1866

The building and the surrounding park were used for many public purposes throughout the early 20th century. The Tower Building served as headquarters for the United Confederate Veterans Reunion, May 15–18, 1911. Over 106,000 Civil War veterans, the largest popular gathering in the history of the city up to that time, attended and were housed in the building or camped in the park, which had also become a popular camping area. Later the building served as an armory for the Arkansas National Guard. In 1912, the second floor of the Tower Building became Little Rock's first public library. In 1917, Little Rock built a fire station in the park. A band shell named for H. H. Foster also was built in the park during this time, but no longer exists. In 1936, Works Progress Administration built the Museum of Fine Arts, now called the Arkansas Arts Center, just south of the Tower Building.

The arsenal was listed in the National Register of Historic Places in 1970. Due to its association with the Camden Expedition of 1864, the arsenal may be included in the Camden Expedition Sites National Historic Landmark designated in 1994.

In 1942, the Tower Building was renovated due to the efforts of the Æsthetic Club, Little Rock philanthropist Frederick W. Allsop, and the Works Progress Administration. It became the new home of the Arkansas Museum of Natural History and Antiquities, which had been located in Little Rock City Hall. The museum remained in the tower building for approximately fifty-five years. The area surrounding the Tower Building had been known as Arsenal Park when the first decommissioned and then later renamed City Park. Due to the efforts of Bernie Babcock, however, the city finally named it MacArthur Park in 1942 in honor of Douglas MacArthur.

In 1997, the Museum of Science and Natural History merged with the Little Rock Children's Museum, which had been located in Union Station, to form the Arkansas Museum of Discovery. The new museum was relocated to a historic building in the Little Rock River Market District. The MacArthur Museum of Arkansas Military History opened on May 19, 2001, in the Tower Building. The new museum's goal is to educate and inform visitors about the military history of Arkansas, preserve the Tower Building, honor servicemen and servicewomen of the United States and commemorate the birthplace of Douglas MacArthur.

=== Construction ===
The arsenal was constructed at the request of Governor James S. Conway in response to the perceived dangers of frontier life and concerns over possible confrontations with Native Americans who were passing through the state on their way to established Indian Territory following their removal from the southern United States. Thirty-six acres were appropriated on the outskirts of Little Rock by Major Robert B. Lee of the U.S. Army. The land had been previously used as a racetrack by the local jockey club. John Wormley Walker, a builder for the Federal Government, supervised the construction. Originally $14,000 was allocated for the construction of the arsenal, but proved inadequate. The budget was later increased to $30,000. Work began on the Tower Building in 1840, and it was the first permanent structure of the arsenal to be built. Being originally constructed to store ammunition, the building was designed with 3-foot-thick (0.91 m) exterior walls. The original plans called for it to be built of stone, however, masonry was used instead. The Arkansas Gazette referred to the structure as "A splendid specimen of masonry".

=== American Civil War ===
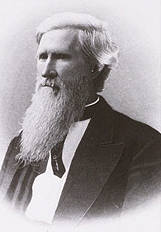
Henry M. Rector, governor from 1860 to 1862

For several years the arsenal, which was owned by the federal government, served as a simple arms depot and was staffed with only a handful of soldiers. But in November 1860, with the American Civil War on the horizon, a company of the Second United States Artillery, consisting of sixty-five men, was transferred to Little Rock under the command of Captain James Totten. On January 15, 1861, the state legislature decided to hold a referendum to determine if a state convention should be held to consider the issue of secession and to elect delegates to such a convention. It was planned for February 18; however, events at the arsenal, would not wait. On January 28, then Governor Henry M. Rector informed Captain Totten that he and his soldiers would be "permitted to remain in the possession of the Federal officers until the State, by authority of the people, shall have determined to sever their connection with the General Government," Totten responded to this by telling the Governor that his orders came from the United States Government and began a desperate but ultimately futile dispatch of letters and telegrams asking for reinforcements, although rumors were widely spread that they were already coming. The first telegraph wire to span between Little Rock and Memphis had recently been completed. Local attorney John M. Harrell was asked to compose the first telegraph dispatched from Arkansas's capital. In his message, Harrell reported unconfirmed rumors that more federal troops had been sent to reinforce the Little Rock Arsenal.

The United States troops at the outposts of the western frontier of the state and in the Indian nation have all been recalled from winter quarters to reinforce the garrison at Fort Smith. The garrison at Fort Smith had been previously transferred to the United States Arsenal in this city (Little Rock). The arsenal is one of the richest depositories of military stores in the United States and is supposed to be the ultimate destination of the tropps[sic]ordered from the frontier.

-John M. Harrell Telegram, January 31, 1861

The item was intended simply as a piece of news, but telegraph lines quickly spread the news throughout the state, fueling procession sentiment. The rumor was interpreted by some Arkansans as a call from the governor to assemble to help expel the federal troops from the arsenal. By February 5, six militia units, consisting of 1,000 men, with a guarantee that the numbers could be increased to 5,000 if the situations deemed it necessary, had assembled in Little Rock. Governor Rector vehemently denied ordering the troops to assemble or giving any order at all in connection with the troops. Faced with the fact that the military had assembled believing they were following his orders and the consensus of the citizens of Little Rock against any armed conflict between the civilian army and federal troops, Governor Rector was forced to take control of the situation. On February 6, he sent a formal demand for surrender of the arsenal to Captain Totten,

This movement is prompted by the feeling that pervades the citizens of this State that in the present emergency the arms and munitions of war in the Arsenal should be under the control of the State authorities, in order to their security. This movement, although not authorized by me, has assumed such an aspect that it becomes my duty, as the executive of this Sate, to interpose my official authority to prevent a collision between the people of the State and the Federal troops under your command. I therefore demand in the name of the State the delivery of the possession of the Arsenal and munitions of war under your charge to the State authorities, to be held subject to the action of the convention to be held on the 4th of March next.

Perhaps because Abraham Lincoln had not yet been inaugurated as President, Captain Totten received no instructions from his superiors and was forced to withdraw his troops. He agreed to surrender the arsenal as long as the governor agreed to three provisions:

1. The governor would take possession of the arsenal in the name of the United States.
2. The soldiers would be allowed safe passage in any direction carrying any personal and public property besides munitions of war.
3. The soldiers would be allowed to march away as men leaving under orders, not as conquered and surrendering soldiers.

On the morning of February 8, 1861, Rector and Totten signed an agreement placing the arsenal in the hands of state officials. That afternoon, the citizen militia marched to the arsenal with Governor Rector at its head. All of the federal troops had left at this point, except Totten who had stayed behind to listen to the Governor's speech and to hand the arsenal over in person.

The Little Rock Arsenal was classified in 1860 as an "arsenal of deposit," meaning that it was simply a warehouse for the storage of weapons intended for the use of the state militia in times of crisis. Thus there were no substantial operations for ordnance fabrication or repairs, nor for the manufacture of cartridges at the time the Arsenal fell into State hands. Most of these operations were started from scratch through the efforts of the Arkansas Military Board.

Inside the Little Rock Arsenal after its seizure in February, 1861, the Confederates inventoried some 10,247 weapons, 250,000 musket cartridges, and 520,000 percussion caps, as well as the four bronze cannon of Totten's battery. Long arms in the Arsenal's inventory consisted of:

M1822 .69 cal (flintlock) 5,625
M1822 .69 cal (percussion-converted) 53
M1842 .69 cal smoothbore (percussion) 357
M1855 .58 cal rifle-muskets 900
M1817 common rifles 125
M1841 rifle ("Mississippi Rifle") 54
M1847 musketoon 2
Hall's carbines 267
Hall's rifles (flintlock) 2,864

Total 10,247

Of this number, approximately 9600 weapons were serviceable, or ready-for-issue. Note there were only 1,364 percussion weapons available. Disposition of the weapons found in the Arsenal is somewhat sketchy, but from various records it can be surmised that the 5th, 6th, 7th, and 8th Arkansas Infantry Regiments, mustered in June, 1861, were issued M1816/M1822 .69 caliber flintlocks. The 9th and 10th Arkansas, four companies of Kelly's 9th Arkansas Battalion, and the 3rd Arkansas Cavalry Regiment were issued flintlock Hall's Rifles. The units comprising the infantry force of Van Dorn's Army of the West were the 1st and 2nd Arkansas Mounted Rifles were also armed with M1822 flintlocks from the Little Rock Arsenal. By the time the 11th and 12th Arkansas Infantry Regiments mustered in at Little Rock, the supply of arms had been almost completely exhausted, and only old "junker" weapons were left.

Most of the equipment, arms, and machinery at the Little Rock Arsenal was removed to east of the Mississippi River by order of Maj. Gen. Earl Van Dorn in April and May 1862, and accountability for it is lost at that point. By all appearances, the equipment was sent down the river to Napoleon, Arkansas, and from there to Jackson Mississippi, where it was probably destroyed during the Vicksburg campaign in the early summer of 1863.

Major General Thomas C. Hindman, sent to command the district of Arkansas in May, 1862, found the state nearly destitute of military material. Hindman established another armory at Arkadelphia, and revived the Little Rock Arsenal as a collection point and depot for armaments and ammunition manufacture for small arms. Hindman recorded:

"Machinery was made for manufacturing percussion caps and small arms, and both were turned out in small quantity, but of excellent quality. Lead mines were opened and worked, and a chemical laboratory was established and successfully operated in aid of the Ordnance Department and in the manufacture of calomel, castor oil, spirits of nitre, the various tinctures of iron, and other valuable medicines. Most of these works were located at or near Arkadelphia on the Ouachita River, 75 miles south from Little Rock. The tools, machinery, and the material were gathered piecemeal or else made by hand labor. Nothing of this sort had been before attempted on Government account in Arkansas to my knowledge, except for the manufacture of small arms, the machinery for which was taken away by General Van Dorn and there was neither capital nor sufficient enterprise among the citizens to engage in such undertakings. A further supply, along with lead and caps, was procured from the citizens of Little Rock and vicinity by donation, purchases, and impressments.

This ammunition, and that which I brought with me, was rapidly prepared for use at the Laboratory established at the Little Rock Arsenal for that purpose. As illustrating as the pitiful scarcity of material in the country, the fact may be stated that it was found necessary to use public documents of the State Library for cartridge paper. Gunsmiths were employed or conscripted, tools purchased or impressed, and the repair of the damaged guns I brought with me and about an equal number found at Little Rock commenced at once. But, after inspecting the work and observing the spirit of the men I decided that a garrison 500 strong could hold out against Fitch and that I would lead the remainder - about 1500 - to Gen'l Rust as soon as shotguns and rifles could be obtained from Little Rock instead of pikes and lances, with which most of them were armed. Two days elapsed before the change could be effected."

The Confederate ordnance establishment at Little Rock was reactivated in August, 1862. Looking around for a suitable person to head this activity, General Hindman turned to the Confederate Navy and borrowed Lieutenant John W. Dunnington. Lt. Dunnington was the commander of the gunboat C.S.S. Pontchartrain, which had been brought to Little Rock in hopes of converting it to an ironclad. Dunnington was selected to head the ordnance works at Little Rock, and although he continued to draw his pay from the Confederate Navy Department, he was placed in charge of all Confederate ordnance activities (which included artillery functions) there with the rank of lieutenant colonel.

Lt. Col. Dunnington's "Returns for the month of August, 1862, at Little Rock Arsenal, C.S.A.," are found in Vol. 149, Chapter IV of the "Captured Rebel Ordnance Records," and are most enlightening as to the scope of Confederate ordnance activities at Little Rock during this crucial time. According to Dunnington, "When I assumed command at this Post, all material had been removed to Arkadelphia. There were no persons employed. No shops were open for repair of arms or for fabricating ammunition. Material, tools, etc., had to be procured as well as the employment of laborers. Work commenced the last part of the month."

The military force at Little Rock under Dunnington's command consisted of four officers: himself, Major John B. Lockman, Captain C.C. Green, and 2nd Lt. W.W. Murphy. In addition to these, he had 20 enlisted men and a civilian force composed of a foreman, 2 clerks, 3 gunsmiths for repairing small arms, a laboratorian, 26 laborers in the ammunition laboratory, and a carpenter for making packing boxes.

During the month of August, 1862, the following work was performed: "Fabricated: one pair of musket bullet moulds; 10,000 buck & ball shot cartridges; repaired: 750 muskets, shotguns, and rifles; received and repaired: ordnance stores and ordnances; performed: guard, office, and police duties; inspected: Posts at Camden and Arkadelphia."

Lt. Col. Dunnington continued to build up his works at Little Rock until November 1862, when Captain Sanford C. Faulkner (composer of The Arkansas Traveler) was placed in charge of the Arsenal. Dunnington presumably returned to his naval duties and the Pontchartrain.

A "Summary of the Work Done for November, 1862, Little Rock Arsenal" shows: Fabrication:

75,000 buck & ball cartridges - percussion
14,000 buck & ball cartridges - flint
275 paper fuzes
117 rounds, 6-pounder canister shot
130 rounds, 6-pounder ball shot
96 ammunition packing boxes

Repaired:

2,236 shotguns and rifles (repaired mostly for troops in service)
23 pistols (repaired mostly for troops in service)

Received & Issued:

752 packages of ordnance and ordnance stores received and mostly issued to troops in service.

Repaired and painted:

4 gun carriages

Performed:

Guard, office, and police duties.

Perhaps the most illuminating points of the above "Summary of Work" and those for following months are that the standard ammunition made was ."buck & ball", indicating that the .69 caliber smoothbores and shotguns remained the predominant caliber weapon in use, and of this, nearly one sixth or more of all small arms ammunition was still for flintlock weapons, indicating that no less than a sixth of the Confederate troops in this vicinity were still armed with obsolete flintlock weapons.

The "Summaries of Work done at Little Rock Arsenal, C.S.A." continue at about the same pace and scale from August 1862 until August 1863. Appended to the "Summary" for August, 1863 is the ominous notation, "During the last week in the month, nearly all stores at the Arsenal have been packed and sent to Arkadelphia, in obedience to orders from Chief of Ordnance, District of Arkansas." This then marks the beginning of the evacuation of ordnance activities from Little Rock, with the city being surrendered to the advancing Federal troops of Frederick Steele's Arkansas Expedition on September 11, 1863.

In 1864, after Little Rock fell to the Union Army and the arsenal had been recaptured, General Fredrick Steele marched 8,500 troops from the arsenal beginning the Camden Expedition.

=== Brooks-Baxter War ===
In 1874, the arsenal was briefly seized once more by Joseph Brooks loyalists.

=== Decommissioning ===
In 1873, the arsenal was renamed Little Rock Barracks and the main building used as married officers' quarters. The building was drastically altered the inside and outside. Prior to renovation, a rear basement door provided the only entrance, while the tower served as a hoist to move munitions between floors. By 1868, front and rear porches had been added to the building, as well as interior walls and stairs, some of which remain today, including the central staircase. In 1880, Douglas MacArthur was born on the northwest upper floor of this building while his father, U.S. Army Captain Arthur MacArthur, was stationed there.

In the 1880s, the federal government began closing many small arsenals around the country in favor of smaller ones built near railroads for quick deployment. The arsenal commander received word from Washington that the Little Rock site must be abandoned "not later than October 1, 1890." On April 12, 1893, the tower building and the surrounding buildings were traded to the city of Little Rock for 1,000 acres (4 km^{2}) in Big Rock Mountain on the north side of the Arkansas River, present day North Little Rock, under the condition that the building and land be "forever exclusively devoted to the uses and purposes of a public park." That site later became Fort Logan H. Roots. All of the original buildings surrounding the Tower Building were demolished.

=== Æsthetic Club ===
In 1894 the Little Rock Æsthetic Club, one of the oldest women's societies west of the Mississippi River, moved into the Tower Building. This was prompted due to increased membership and a need for larger, more permanent quarters. The previous year, club members working with women's organizations throughout the state, raised money to furnish the Arkansas Building of the Columbian Exposition at The Chicago World's Fair. At the fair's conclusion, artifacts from the exhibit were displayed in the Tower Building, with the Æsthetic Club invited to meet in the "Columbian Room."

Except for Æsthetic Club meetings, the Tower Building remained largely unoccupied for almost fifty years and suffered significant deterioration. The Æsthetic Club provided much-needed financial support during the period and even paid the electric bill during the Great Depression. The Æsthetic Club is still headquartered in the Tower Building.

== Museum ==
The MacArthur Museum of Arkansas Military History, named for General Douglas MacArthur who was born in what is now the museum when it was military barracks is located in the Tower Building. The museum opened in May 2001 and as of 2018 had been visited by more than 500,000 people. It is operated by the Little Rock Department of Parks and Recreation and tells the stories of Arkansas' soldiers from the Civil War through Vietnam via artifacts, photographs, weapons and other ephemera. One of its galleries is focused on the Battle of Little Rock.

== See also ==
- Bayou Fourche Battlefield
- David O. Dodd
- Old State House Museum
