= Bernie Babcock =

American author

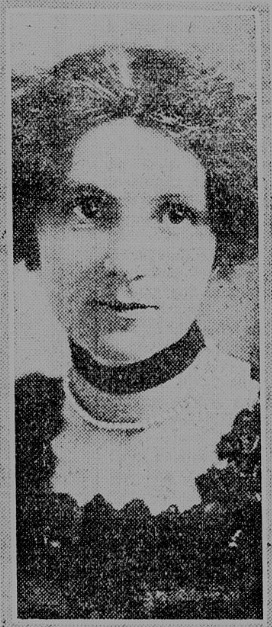
- Babcock circa 1919
- Born: Julia Burnelle Smade; April 28, 1868; Union, Ohio
- Died: June 14, 1962 (aged 94); Petit Jean, Arkansas
- Writing career
- Genres: novels, journalism
- Notable work: The Daughter of the Republican

Julia Burnelle Smade "Bernie" Babcock (born April 28, 1868, Union, Ohio - June 14, 1962 Petit Jean, Arkansas) was an American writer who wrote over 40 novels, as well as numerous essays and newspaper articles.

== Biography ==
After being widowed at age 29 with five children to support, she began working as a writer. Her first book, the pro-Prohibition The Daughter of the Republican (1900), sold over 100,000 copies in six months.

Babcock was society page editor of the Arkansas Democrat and later owned and edited The Arkansas Sketch Book, the first venture of its kind in the state. She wrote Mammy, a drama read at Chautauqua and on lyceum circuits. She is also the author of, Yesterday and To-Day in Arkansas (1917), The Coming of the King (1921), The Soul of Ann Rutledge, Abraham Lincoln's Romance (1919), and The Soul of Abraham Lincoln (1923).

For her novels she was paid $300 to $500 each. In May 1927, she wrote, “no money in sight to pay bills due June One . . . Well — there’s nothing to do but keep trying. Who wants an easy job anyway.” The Great Depression found her almost destitute. In 1927 Babcock founded The Arkansas Museum of Natural History and Antiquities, financed with donations from friends, in Little Rock as a response to H. L. Mencken’s derision of Arkansas. She worked as a folklore editor for the Federal Writers' Project. In 1953, she retired to a home on Petit Jean Mountain, where she continued to write, publishing a volume of poetry, The Marble Woman, at age 91 in 1959. She died at her home on June 14, 1962; a neighbor found her with a manuscript still in her hand.

== See also ==
- The Tower Building of the Little Rock Arsenal
