= Museum of Discovery and Science =

Science museum in Fort Lauderdale, Florida, U.S.

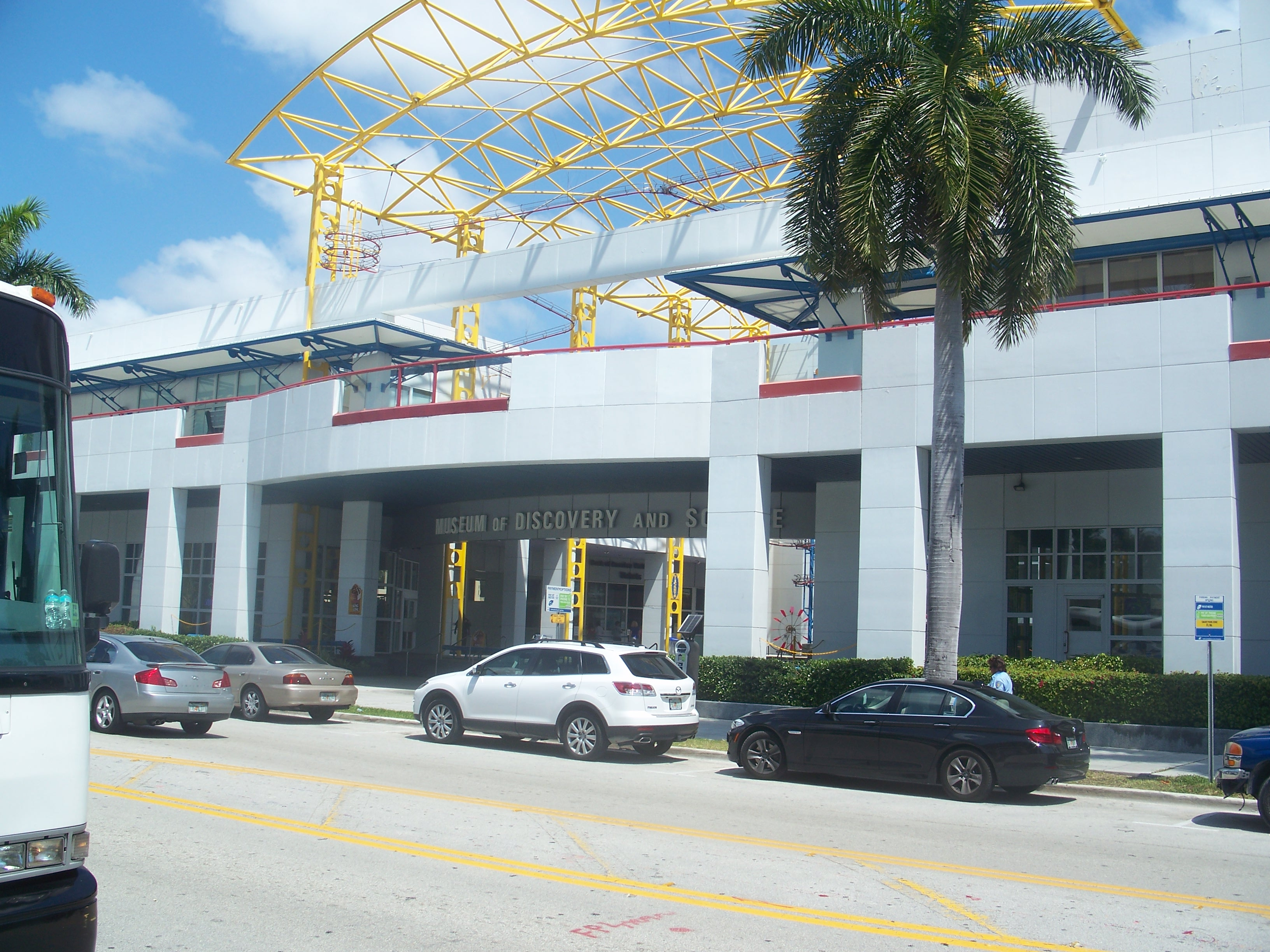

- Location within Florida
- Established: 1976; 50 years ago (as The Discovery Center)
- Location: Fort Lauderdale, Florida
- Coordinates: 26.120451°N 80.14745°W
- Website: mods.org

The Museum of Discovery and Science is a museum focused on science located in Fort Lauderdale, Florida, United States.

== History ==
=== EcoDiscovery Center Expansion ===
In November 2011, the museum opened a 34,000 square foot, $25 million expansion, designed by Cambridge Seven Associates. The expansion, titled the EcoDiscovery Center, doubled the amount of exhibit space in the museum and includes exhibits called: The Everglades Airboat Adventure, Prehistoric Florida, Otters at Play, Storm Center, and Florida Water Story. The new wing also houses four lifetime learning spaces and a large temporary exhibit space. The new wing opened simultaneously with the 100-seat Keller Science Theater.

== Description ==
It is one of the largest museums of its kind in Florida, and has the most visitors of any museum in the state. The museum features an IMAX theater that shows 3D IMAX films. The museum also features a number of "ecoscapes", as well as a simulated ride to Mars, a simulated airboat ride in the Everglades and a MaxFlight airplane flight simulator. Among the more popular aspects of the museum are the quantity and variety of Floridian animal species on display. The public are allowed to get quite close to the animal life such as otters, baby alligators, snakes, tortoises, rabbits, bats, tarantulas, scorpions, geckos, cockroaches, centipedes, hermit crabs, freshwater fish, freshwater stingrays, black pacus, frogs, tadpoles, alligator snapping turtle, turtles, sharks, saltwater fish, horseshoe crabs and a sea turtle, and the museum frequently has organized animal-centered demonstrations, or more informal meet-and-greets with native and exotic Florida fauna.

Other than the animals on display, the Museum of Discovery and Science currently features a Discovery Center for ages 7 and under, Go Green exhibit, Runways to Rockets including airplane simulators and information about space, Powerful You! exhibit, minerals and rocks on display, prehistoric fish and dinosaur eggs and fossils on display, games, puzzles, the Explore Store, food concessions, and a moving exhibit.

The Museum of Discovery and Science moved to its current location in downtown Fort Lauderdale in 1992. The "Great Gravity Clock" in front of the entrance is one of the main features of the museum and is one of only three in the world. The other two are in Japan and Mexico. The museum plays host to birthday parties, (sea) turtle walks and camp-ins, and has its own summer camp.

The Museum of Discovery and Science also funds a volunteer program that allows children and adults alike to give back to the community.

The IMAX theater offers IMAX with Laser and features a 4980 square foot screen, playing both 2D and 3D movies. The six-story-high screen is the largest in South Florida.

The museum also hosts many special event activities such as the annual "Food and Wine Gala" to raise money.

== See also ==
- MOD., Adelaide, South Australia
- Museum of Discovery, Little Rock, Arkansas
