= Anastacio Caedo =

Filipino sculptor

Anastacio Tanchauco Caedo (14 August 1907 – 12 May 1990) was a Filipino sculptor. His style of sculpture was classical realist in the tradition of his mentor, Guillermo Tolentino.

His best known works include the MacArthur Landing site in Palo Red Beach, Leyte; the Benigno Aquino Monument which was originally at the corner of Ayala Avenue and Paseo de Roxas in Makati; the Bonifacio Monument in Pugad Lawin, Balintawak; and numerous statues of Jose Rizal, most notably the ones displayed in Philippine embassies throughout the world. He produced numerous commissioned representational sculptures mainly monuments of national heroes and successful Filipino politicians, businessmen, and educators.

Caedo is also notable for having refused the honor of being awarded a National Artist of the Philippines - in 1983, 1984, and 1986.

== Family and early life ==
Anastacio Tanchauco Caedo was born on Aug. 14, 1907 in the Municipality of Batangas (now Batangas City), the capital of Batangas province. His parents were Arsenio Caedo and Genoveva Tanchauco.

== Education ==
At the age of 14, Elementary education at Calaca Elementary School in Batangas. In 1925, he entered the University of the Philippines (UP) School of Fine Arts. Even though lacking the required High School diploma in order to enter the university, Caedo made it to the UP College of Fine Arts through the direct recommendation of Professor Guillermo Tolentino. Thus, Caedo studied night high school while taking up Fine Arts at the UP.

== Career ==
Caedo's career as a sculptor began in the year 1925 when he worked with Guillermo E. Tolentino's atelier as student-assistant and protégé. He assisted Tolentino in creating most of his landmark commissions like: the UP Oblation; the Bonifacio Monument in Caloocan; the Rizal Monument in front of the Rizal Provincial Capitol; and the Shaw Monument at Shaw Boulevard in Mandaluyong to name a few.

He graduated in 1932 from the UP College of Fine Arts.

The U.P. Oblation statue was actually modeled after the physique of Caedo because of his lean and muscular body (he was an amateur bodybuilder). Tolentino later relegated the task of building the other Oblation figures in U.P. Baguio and Manila to Caedo. That's not all, though. UP Professor Emeritus Grace Javier Alfonso, a former student of his, acknowledged that she recalled his instructing her to remember that he served as the model for the UP Oblation.

After World War II, Caedo was able to establish himself as a sculptor on the commissions from the Jesuits. He executed at least eight major works for the Jesuits. He was also commissioned to build the MacArthur Landing site in Palo, Leyte, as well as other monuments of Philippine national heroes.

Caedo was known for injecting vitality and breathing life into his sculptures, which became the hallmarks of his style. He was also commissioned to build the monuments of Bonifacio in Balintawak, Rizal in Germany, Juan Luna in Madrid, Apolinario Mabini in Manila, and Chief Kipua in Guam. He ultimately became known as a monument builder, and he built more monuments around the world than any other Filipino sculptor. For his lifelike bust of Rizal and his numerous monuments on Rizal, he was conferred the title "Knight Grand Commander" by the Order of the Knights of Rizal.

In 1951, he became a faculty member of the UP School of Fine Arts where he served for 20 years. He was appointed as Head of the Sculpture division of UP Fine Arts from 1957 to the early 1980s. His students and apprentices included Eduardo Castrillo, Abdul Mari Imao, and Ross Arcilla. Caedo's son, Florante Caedo, also learned sculpture from him, and became a noted sculptor in his own right.

Professor Caedo is also known as a meticulous portrait sculptor. His clients included Presidents Aguinaldo, Quezon, Osmeña, Quirino, Aquino, and Marcos. He also created several portrait busts of famous movie stars, politicians, and businessmen.

== Achievements and famous sculptural Works ==
- Dying Soldier (1925), Gold Medal, National Heroes Day Competition
- "The Problem" (1926) Gold Medal, Philippine Exposition of 1926
- Trece Martires de Cavite (Thirteen Martyrs of Cavite) (1931)
- Padre Jose Burgos (Fr. Jose Burgos) (1932)
- 1952 – Second Prize, Art Association of the Philippines
- 196

- Araw ng Maynila Award for his sculpture "Andres Bonifacio"

- 1966 – "The Risen Christ", Gold Medal, Philippine Art Exposition
- "Malakas at Maganda" sculpture which became the trophy of Philippine Sports Association
- "Mercury" Professor Caedo's version of Giambologna's famous sculpture.
- 14-ft statue of St. Thomas More – Ateneo de Manila University, Quezon City (formerly at the Ateneo College of Law at Padre Faura St., Manila)
- The MacArthur Landing site in Palo Red Beach, Leyte
- Benigno Aquino Monument (1986) – Luisita, Tarlac (originally at Ayala Avenue corner Paseo de Roxas, Makati)
- The Official Trophy of the Film Academy of the Philippines.
- The Rizal monuments in every Philippine embassy
- Rizal Monument in Heidelberg, Commissioned by the German Government
- Rizal Monument in Wilhelmsfeld, Commissioned by the German Government
- Bonifacio Monument in Pugad Lawin, Balintawak
- Pres. Sergio Osmena monument, Osmena Mansion, Cebu City
- Juan Luna monument, Manila
- Rizal as a Student, Sinco Social Garden Foundation University Dumaguete City
- Chief Kipuha monument, Commissioned by the Guam Government
- Juan Luna monument, Madrid, Spain, commissioned by the Spanish Government
- Raha Sulayman monument, UP Vargas Museum
- General Paua Monument, Imus Cavite
- President Aguinaldo monument, Malolos, Bulacan
- Francisco Balagtas monument, Balagtas, Bulacan
- Quezon Monument, Quezon City Hall
- The Death March Memorial, Capas, Tarlac
- The Mabini monument, Kalaw, Manila
- Sen. Eulogio "Amang" Rodriguez monument, Barangay Sampaloc, Tanay, Rizal
- President Jose P. Laurel monument, Sto. Tomas City, Batangas

Professor Caedo refused several times the nomination to become a National Artist in 1983, 1984, and 1986. He died on 12 May 1990 at the age of 83.

== Personal life ==
Professor Caedo was married in 1937 to Ms. Florencia Beltran (1921–2003) of Bicol. They had six children, one of whom Florante Caedo - became a noted sculptor in his own right. Professor Caedo was known as a philanthropist, regularly donating portions of his earnings to charity. He was an active member of The Lion's Club and The Order of the Knights of Rizal. Frederic Caedo is one of Anastacio Caedo's grandsons that continue the legacy of their family, he is also one of the notable Filipino's sculptors that is making a mark as a Filipino artist in his country.
