= Gaetano Faillace =

American photographer (1901-1994)

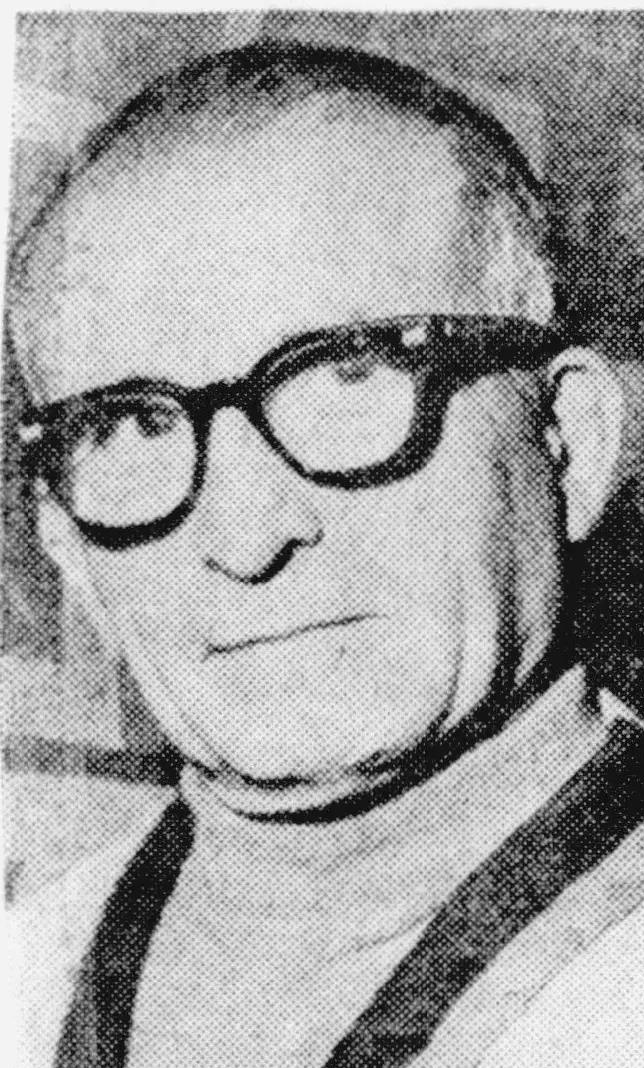
- Gaetano Faillace in 1967
- Born: September 17, 1904; New York City
- Died: December 31, 1991 (aged 87); Fayetteville, North Carolina
- Occupation: Photojournalist

Gaetano Faillace (September 17, 1904 – December 31, 1991) was an American military photographer who served as Douglas MacArthur's personal photographer during World War II and the American occupation of Japan after World War II. During his time in the United States Army, he took many famous images including MacArthur wading ashore during the landing on Leyte, MacArthur with Emperor Hirohito, and the cover photo for MacArthur's book Reminiscences of General of the Army Douglas MacArthur.

== Early life ==
Gaetano Faillace was born on September 17, 1904 in New York City, to Marcello and Francesca (Sciacca) Faillace.

== MacArthur's photographer ==
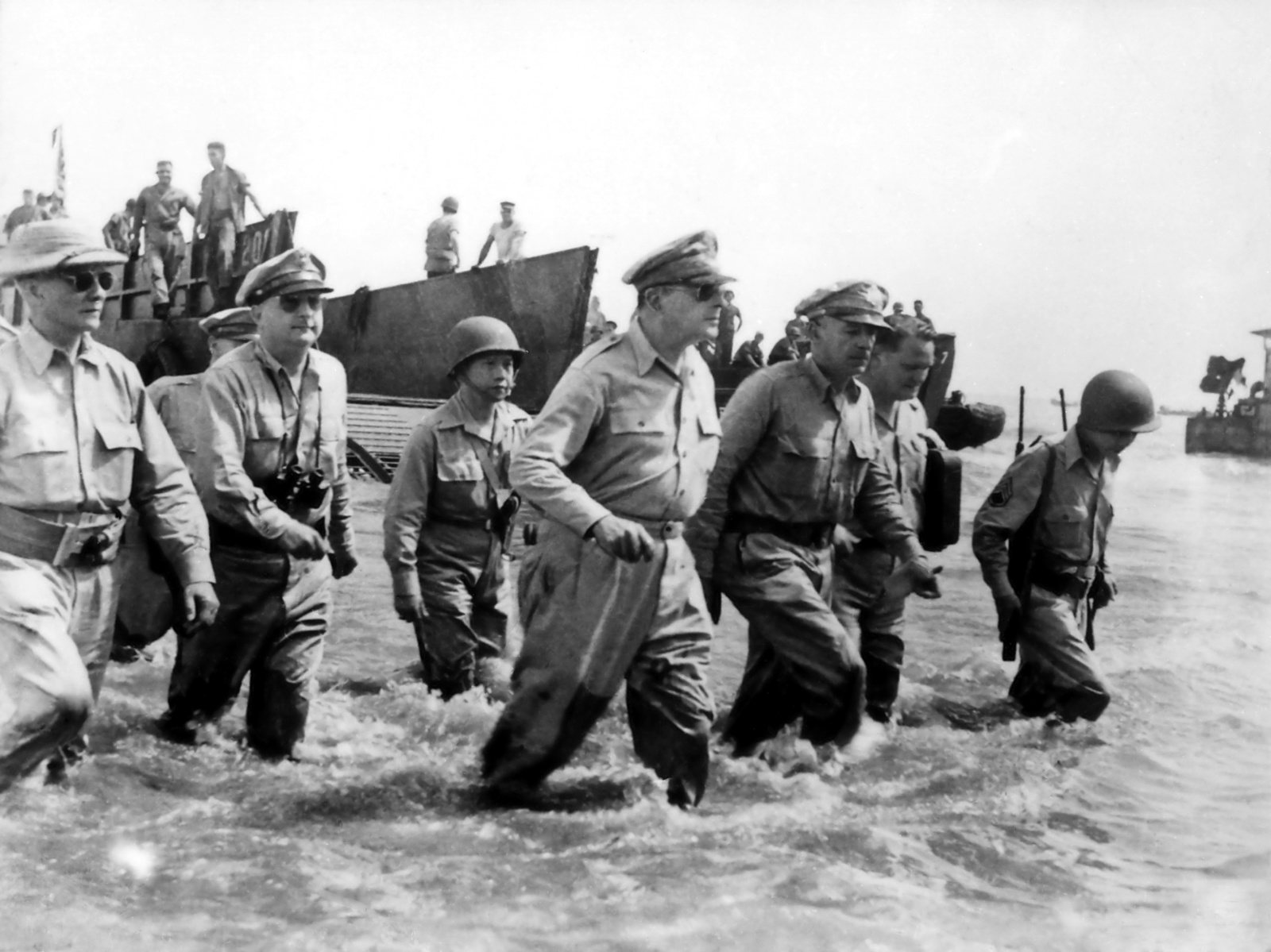
Faillace's picture: "I have returned"—General MacArthur returns to the Philippines with Philippine President Sergio Osmena to his right, Philippine Foreign Affairs Secretary Carlos P. Romulo at his rear, and Sutherland on his left.

=== Rank ===
When photographers were assigned to highly ranked individuals such as General MacArthur, they had to be officers, as they would be present alongside many other highly ranked men. Faillace was a sergeant before being promoted to captain when assigned to the general. After he left MacArthur's service he went back to the rank of sergeant but his temporary commission had progressed during the war and when he retired he jumped ranks to major.

=== Landing at Leyte ===
On 20 October 1944, troops of Walter Krueger's Sixth Army landed on Leyte while MacArthur watched from the light cruiser USS Nashville. That afternoon he arrived off the beach. The advance had not progressed far; snipers were still active and the area was under sporadic mortar fire. When his craft grounded in knee-deep water, MacArthur requested a landing craft, but the beachmaster was too busy to grant his request and MacArthur was compelled to wade ashore. It has often been claimed that the incident was staged but reporter William J. Dunn, who was present during the landing (the only man in the photo not wearing a helmet or hat), said that the rumor "is one of the most ludicrous misconceptions to come out of that war."

After landing on the beach, MacArthur gave his prepared speech, saying:

People of the Philippines: I have returned. By the grace of Almighty God our forces stand again on Philippine soil—soil consecrated in the blood of our two peoples. We have come dedicated and committed to the task of destroying every vestige of enemy control over your daily lives, and of restoring upon a foundation of indestructible strength, the liberties of your people.

=== MacArthur and the Emperor ===
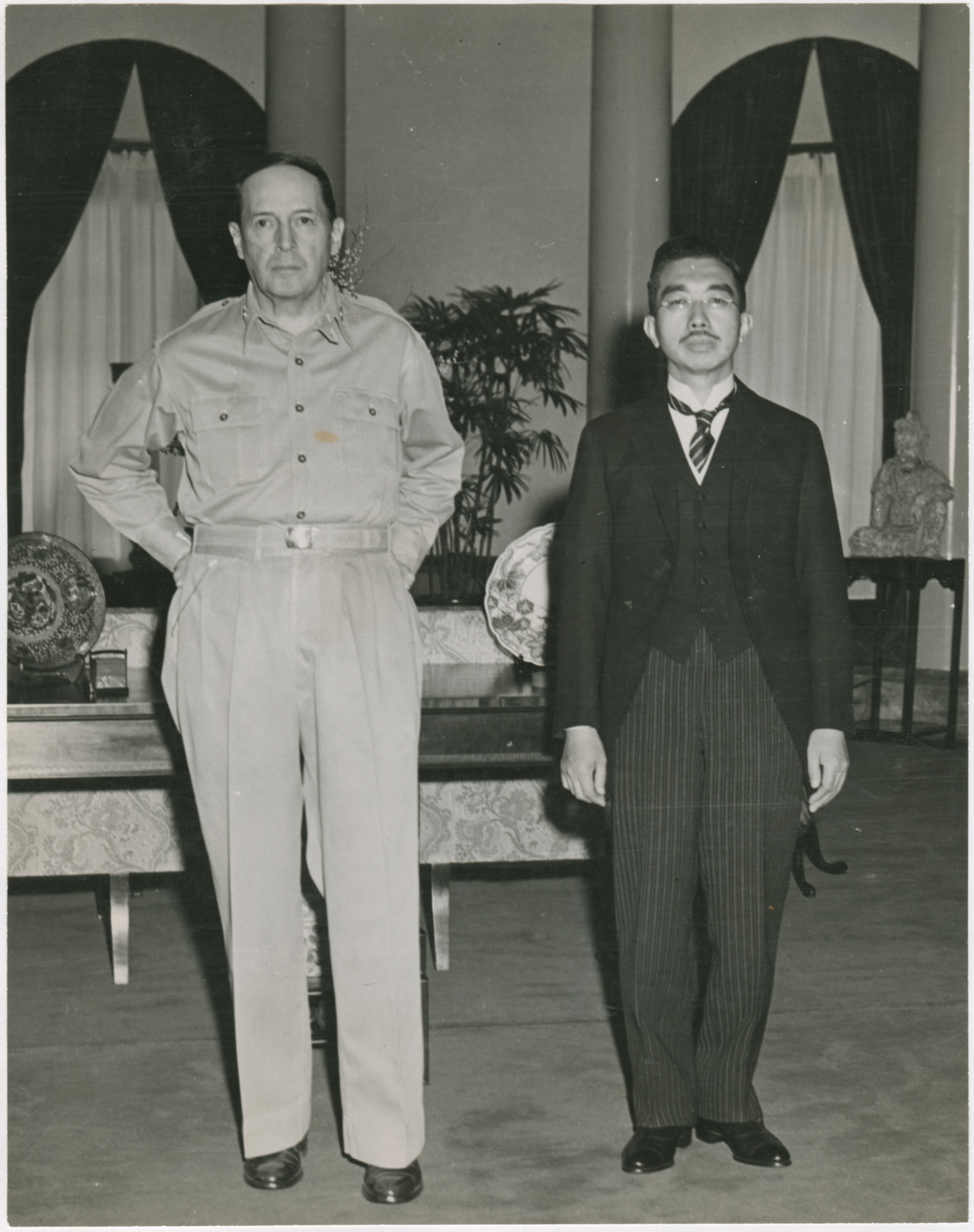
Faillace's picture of General MacArthur and the Emperor at Allied GHQ in Tokyo. September 27, 1945.

After the surrender of Japan on September 2, 1945, Allied military forces occupied the home islands of the country. As Supreme Allied commander MacArthur took residence in Tokyo, he decided on a strategy of continuity for the Japanese people. Even though many Japanese and most Americans wanted the Emperor put on trial (70% of Americans wanted him hanged) MacArthur thought that keeping the Emperor in his position would offer a symbol for the Japanese people to rally around. If the Japanese people could rally around Hirohito and he could be controlled by the Allies, then fewer troops would be required to keep the peace in Japan.

MacArthur and Emperor Hirohito's staff set up a meeting for 10 am on September 27, 1945, to discuss how to save the Emperor's throne. When the Emperor and his entourage arrived, American officers offered to take his hat. This seemed to alarm Hirohito, as he was the God Emperor and his normal Japanese staff never took things from him. As the Emperor handed over his hat, MacArthur burst into the room, saying "You are very, very welcome, sir!" For the officers present, it was the first time they heard the general call anyone "sir". MacArthur then moved to shake his hand, and Hirohito bowed so deeply that because of the Emperor's small stature the handshake took place above his head. During the meeting Gaetano Faillace took three photos of the two men. One captured MacArthur closing his eyes and another the Emperor's mouth gaping open; the third was approved and published in Japanese and international newspapers.

When the picture was published in Japanese papers, the Japanese censors were horrified at the image, which showed a towering and informal MacArthur and a small and very formal Emperor Hirohito. To the Japanese, the God Emperor should always be the most prominent person in a picture, and to have an American standing in his company with an air of power went against all their training. The Americans, however, who had forced the Japanese censors to publish the photo, were very pleased as the picture seemed to encapsulate the change that the occupation of Japan represented.

== Retirement and death ==
In 1983 Faillace released a Japanese book with photographs he took during the occupation. On December 31, 1991 he died from complications of cancer in Fayetteville, North Carolina.

At the time of his death he had family throughout America including brothers, Joseph Faillace, and Antonio Faillace in Seattle, sisters Grace Mauro of Miami, Florida and Angela Buscemi of Fort Lauderdale, Florida. His children, including his daughters Deon Faillace, Denise Danaher, and Donna Faillace and his son, Douglas Faillace, lived in Detroit. He also had two grandchildren.

== In popular culture ==
Gerardo Moretti, aka Jerry Martin (uncredited) portrayed Gaetano Faillace in the 1977 Universal Studios biographical film MacArthur, starring Gregory Peck. In one scene, Peck forgets Martin's character's name and accidentally addresses him by his real name "Jerry." The editor ultimately left the scene in, as is. Martin died in 2010 and is entombed at the Hollywood Forever Cemetery in Los Angeles, California.

== Bibliography ==
Notes

References

- Beach, John H. (November 21, 2010). "Gaetano Faillace". Army Pictorial Center. Archived from the original on September 13, 2011.
- Dower, John (1999). Embracing Defeat: Japan in the Wake of World War II. New York: W. W. Norton & Company. ISBN 978-0-393-32027-5. OCLC 39143090.
- Dunn, William J.; Wallace, Mike (2009). Pacific Microphone (2009 ed.). Texas A&M University Press. ISBN 9781603441575. - Total pages: 416
- James, D. Clayton (1975). The Years of MacArthur Volume 2, 1941–1945. Boston: Houghton Mifflin. ISBN 0-395-20446-1. OCLC 12591897.
- Kawabata, Tai (September 3, 2010). "Photos, films depict Tokyo in turbulent times". The Japan Times.
- Lucas, Dean (November 20, 2011). "MacArthur and the Emperor". famouspictures.org.
- MacArthur, Douglas (2001) [1964]. Reminiscences of General of the Army Douglas MacArthur. Annapolis: Bluejacket Books. ISBN 1-55750-483-0. OCLC 220661276.
- Faillace, Gaetano (1983). マッカーサーの見た焼跡: フェーレイス・カラー写真集 : 東京・横浜 1945 年 - Makkasa no mita yakeato: Fereisu kara shashinshu : Tokyo Yokohama 1945-nen (in Japanese) (1983 ed.). 文藝春秋 - Bungei Shunju. ISBN 9784163382302. - Total pages: 175
- "Gaetano Faillace". Sarasota Herald-Tribune. January 4, 1992.
- Okamoto, Shirō (2001). The Man Who Saved Kabuki: Faubion Bowers and Theatre Censorship in Occupied Japan (2001 ed.). University of Hawaii Press. ISBN 9780824824419. - Total pages: 210
- "Photographer dies". The Times-News. January 1, 1992.
