= The Oriental Leyte =

Hotel in Palo in Leyte, Philippines

- Interactive map of the The Oriental Leyte area
- Alternative names: The Oriental Hotel Leyte
- Hotel chain: The Oriental Hotels and Resorts

General information
- Status: Completed
- Location: Palo, Leyte, Philippines
- Coordinates: 11°10′09.5″N 125°0′36.6″E
- Opening: 2012
- Closed: April 6, 2024; 2 years ago
- Operator: LKY Resorts and Hotels, Inc.

Design and construction
- Developer: LKY Development Corporation

Other information
- Number of rooms: 129
- Number of suites: 8

Website
- leyte.theorientalhotels.com

The Oriental Hotel Leyte, also known as The Oriental Leyte, is a defunct hotel in the town of Palo in Leyte, Philippines. It was the only four-star rated hotel in the Eastern Visayas according to the Department of Tourism's National Accommodation Standards at the time of its operation.

The facility was part of The Oriental Hotels and Resorts chain of the LKY Group of Companies.

== History ==
Another hotel used to stand at the site of The Oriental Leyte. This hotel was the MacArthur Park Beach Resort which was built in 1983 by then First Lady Imelda Marcos. The hotel was sequestered by the Philippine national government after the People Power Revolution in 1986 and was transferred to the Leyte local government in 2009.

The Leyte government leased the associated property of the MacArthur hotel to the LKY Resorts and Hotel under a 25-year build, operate and transfer lease agreement in the same year.

The MacArthur Park Hotel's building was demolished to make way for a new hotel building. The Oriental Leyte first opened in 2012 The hotel building sustained heavy damage from Typhoon Haiyan, locally known as Super Typhoon Yolanda, in November 2013 forcing a ceasure of operations. Repair works on the hotel's facilities costed at least ₱300 million and The Oriental Leyte was reopened in 2016.

In January 2020, the Department of Tourism (DOT) gave the hotel a four-star rating under its National Accommodation Standards for hotels. The Oriental Leyte became the first hotel in the Eastern Visayas region to be given star accreditation by the tourism government department. However the hotel experienced a decline in bookings due to the COVID-19 pandemic which worsened in the same year. The hotel would eventually close on April 6, 2024. The new replacement, The Tropics at MacArthur Park, would later open partially in October, and then a soft opening in December that year. The new hotel is still operating as of September 2026.

== Facilities ==
The Oriental Leyte was situated besides the MacArthur Landing Memorial National Park and was connected to the park by a bridge since 2019. The hotel had 129 regular rooms and 8 suites. It also had 13 function rooms and a business center, as well as five videoke rooms, a fitness gym, three swimming pools and a single spa. The hotel prior to the onslaught of Typhoon Haiyan had 110 rooms.

The hotel reportedly in 2020 was a four-star hotel under the DOT's National Accommodation Standards. Under the tourism department's star-rating system, the hotel rated 716 points based on an assessment of its facilities and services.
