= MacArthur Tunnel =

Road tunnel in San Francisco

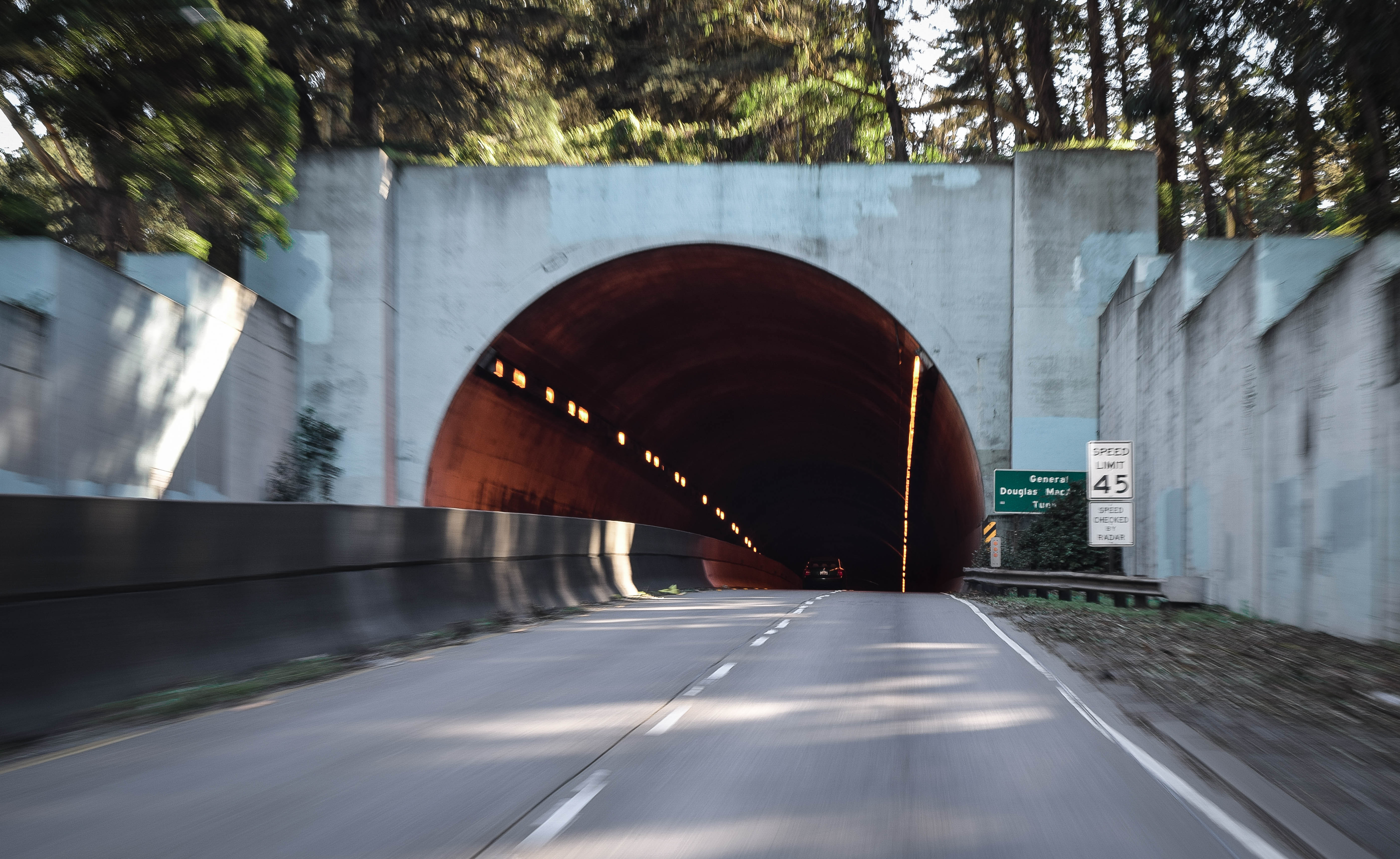
- West entrance of the MacArthur Tunnel

Overview
- Official name: Presidio Tunnel
- Other name: General Douglas MacArthur Tunnel
- Location: San Francisco, California
- Coordinates: 37°47′34″N 122°28′10″W
- Route: SR 1
- Crosses: Presidio of San Francisco

Operation
- Work began: October 1938
- Constructed: Macco Construction
- Opened: April 21, 1940
- Owner: California Department of Transportation
- Traffic: automotive
- Toll: none
- Vehicles per day: 69,000 (2000)

Technical
- Length: 1,300 feet (400 m)
- No. of lanes: 4

The MacArthur Tunnel, formally known as the General Douglas MacArthur Tunnel, is a highway tunnel in San Francisco, California.

It is located within the Presidio of San Francisco, now part of the Golden Gate National Recreation Area.

The tunnel carries California State Route 1 under a large hill and under the Presidio Golf Course. It connects Park Presidio Boulevard (Hwy 1) in the Richmond District to US 101 on Presidio Parkway (formerly the Doyle Drive viaduct), and the Golden Gate Bridge.

== History ==
When the Golden Gate Bridge opened in 1937, the approach for northbound traffic to Marin County was carried solely by Doyle Drive, from the east. Although a second approach from the south, known as the Funston Avenue approach, was included in the initial plans for the bridge, it was not ready in time for the opening; just a year after opening, traffic over the bridge had doubled by 1938, adding urgency to completing the Funston approach. In March 1936, General Paul Malone made clear the Army's position: that the Funston approach would include a tunnel or else the Army would not approve the planned route through the San Francisco Presidio.

General George S. Simonds, the successor to Gen. Malone, indicated tentative approval of plans for a tunnel for the Funston approach in July 1936, but formal approval of the plans and a permit to begin construction were not signed until August 1938 as the plans that had been reviewed – and the accompanying permission to construct on the Presidio – were conceptual up to that point.

The Redwood Empire Association called upon city and Golden Gate Bridge District directors to rename the Funston approach just before it opened in 1940, suggesting possibilities such as "Golden Gate Bridge Parkway," "Golden Gate Bridge-Way," and "Golden Gate Bridge–Redwood Empire-way." The completion of the Funston Avenue approach was celebrated with a two-day gala in April 1940.

=== Tunnel design and construction ===
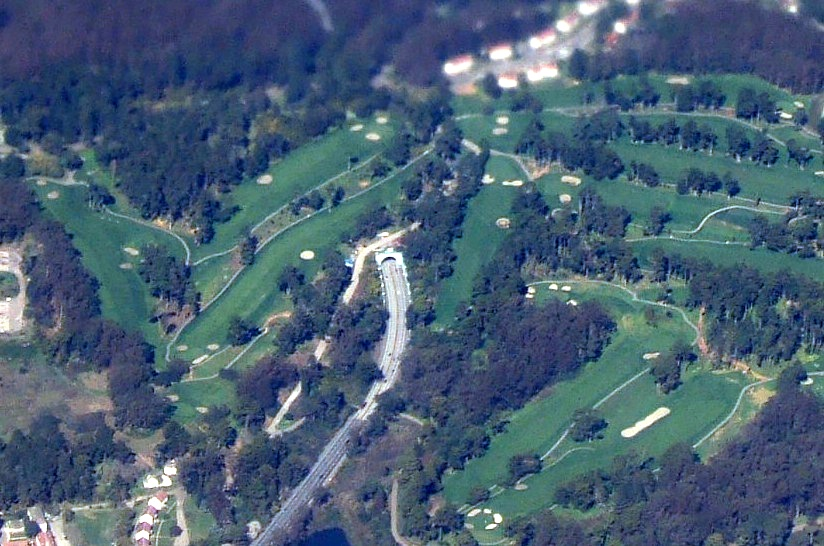
Aerial photograph of the MacArthur Tunnel

The construction contract for the Funston Avenue approach was awarded in September 1938 to Macco Construction company, who had built the approach for southbound traffic over the Waldo Grade. The Macco contract was awarded at their bid of US$593,042 (equivalent to $13,564,300 in 2025) and included the laying of a concrete tunnel 1,300 feet (400 m) long.

The 1,300-foot (400 m) long tunnel accommodates a four-lane roadway. A tunnel was required because the land above the tunnel was being used by the Army for a parade ground and golf course, so leaving an open cut for the highway was impossible. It was constructed by a cut-and-cover sequence: excavating along the tunnel route, fitting steel arch forms, pouring concrete on top of the forms, and returning the fill to the top of the cured concrete. Fill removed from the initial excavation was stockpiled near Mountain Lake, which would serve as the southern drainage point for the Funston approach upon its completion, since the Army also required no drainage onto Presidio property. Tunnel sections were built in 28-foot (8.5 m) lengths, and work was started from each end of the tunnel, working towards the center, allowing two to three sections of tunnel to be completed per week. The open cut-and-cover method was deemed economical because of the relatively small amount of material that would need to be removed.

During the construction of the tunnel, two tees and one green for the golf course were temporarily relocated, and a footbridge was constructed to allow golfers to cross the open cut.

The tunnel was made as long as possible without having to add forced ventilation to dilute carbon monoxide from automobile exhaust, and a 24-by-24-foot (7.3 by 7.3 m) shaft was built mid-way along the tunnel to provide passive ventilation, with the capacity to add a fan later for forced exhaust through the shaft, if necessary. The steel arch forms had previously been used during the construction of the Bartlett Dam in Arizona. Construction of the tunnel began in October 1938 and was complete by January 1940; the Funston Avenue approach was dedicated for service on April 21, 1940.

=== Dedication gala ===
The Funston Avenue approach and the Nineteenth Avenue approach were both dedicated and opened for traffic on April 21, 1940, in themed ceremonies designed to promulgate friendly relations between the Pacific coast states and provinces of Canada, Mexico and the United States. Citizens from the North Bay and other northern counties were encouraged to participate in the opening ceremonies. Delegates from British Columbia; the states of California, Oregon, and Washington; and the consul general of Mexico all attended and spoke at the dedication ceremonies.

=== New name ===
In 1949, the tunnel was known locally as the Funston Avenue tunnel, taking its name from the approach. Other residents would call it the Park Presidio approach. Caltrans currently has two official names for the tunnel, which is designated 34-0016 under the National Bridge Inventory. The tunnel is known as both the Presidio Tunnel and the General Douglas MacArthur Tunnel, having added the MacArthur tunnel designation by Senate Concurrent Resolution 86, introduced by Milton Marks during the 1985–86 Legislative Session.

== Graffiti ==
The top face of the south entrance to the tunnel is a popular target for graffiti vandals due to broken barbed-wire fences. During the 2016 United States presidential campaign, taggers sprayed the words "SF VS TRUMP," only to have the tag changed to "SF [hearts] TRUMP" a few days later.
