= MacArthur Park Historic District =

Historic district in Arkansas, United States

- U.S. National Register of Historic Places
- U.S. Historic district
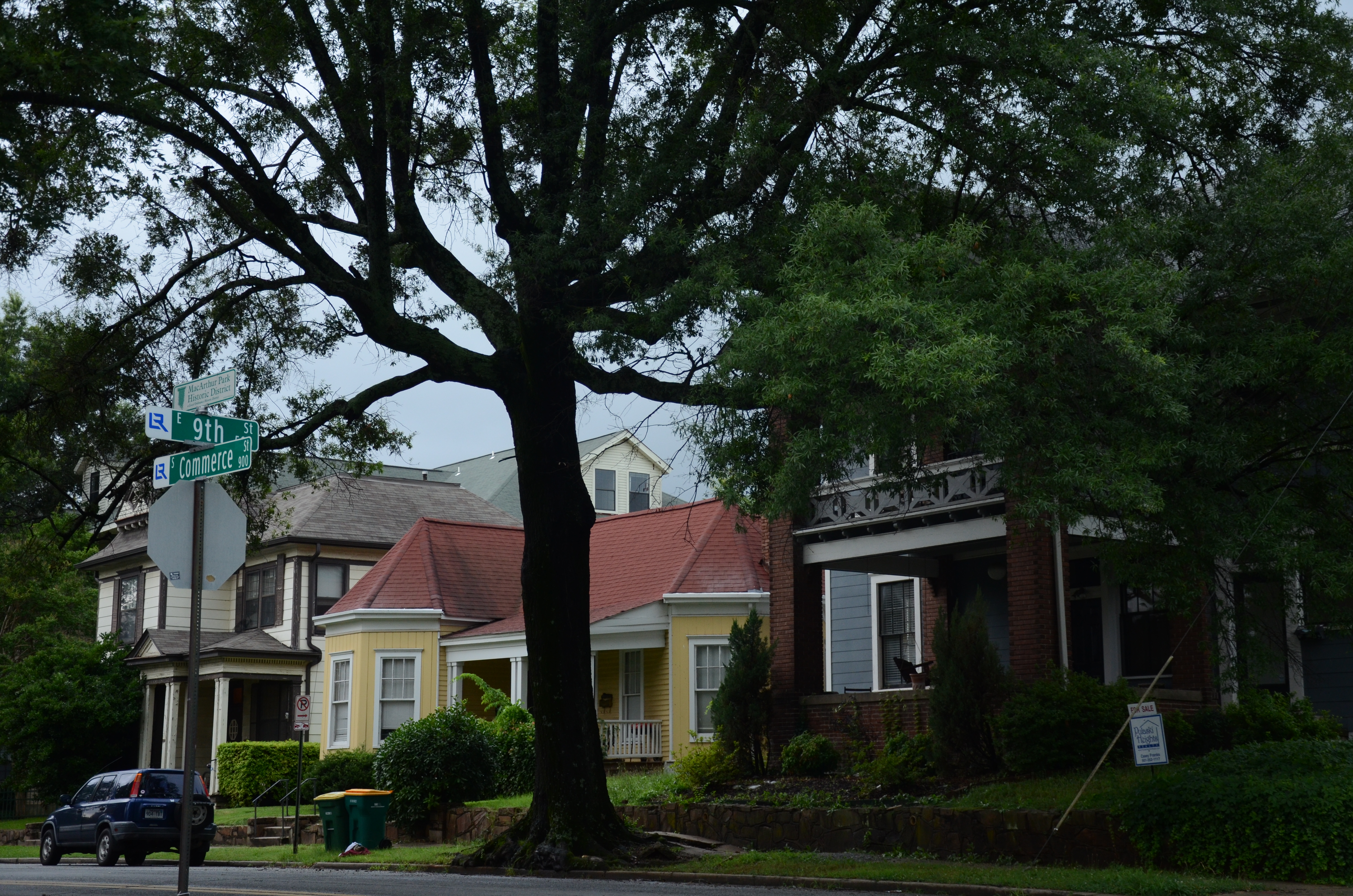

- Location within Arkansas Location within the United States
- Location: Roughly bounded by Ferry, McGowan, McAlmont, 16th, Bragg, 15th, Scott, 9th, Cumberland, and 5th Sts., Little Rock, Arkansas
- Coordinates: 34°44′16″N 92°15′59″W
- Area: 60 acres (24 ha)
- Built: 1840
- Architectural style: Greek Revival, Late Victorian
- NRHP reference No.: 77000269
- Added to NRHP: July 25, 1977

The MacArthur Park Historic District encompasses a remarkably well-preserved collection of Victorian buildings in the heart of Little Rock, Arkansas. The main focal point of the district is MacArthur Park, site of the Tower Building of the Little Rock Arsenal and Little Rock's 19th-century military arsenal. The district extends north and west from the park for about four blocks, to East Capitol Avenue in the north and Scott Street to the west, and extends south, beyond Interstate 630, to East 17th Street. This area contains some of the city's finest surviving antebellum and late Victorian architecture, including a particularly large number (19) of Second Empire houses, and achieved its present form roughly by the 1880s. The MacArthur Park Historic District was listed on the National Register of Historic Places in 1977.

== See also ==
- List of places named for Douglas MacArthur
- National Register of Historic Places listings in Little Rock, Arkansas
