= MacArthur Memorial Marker =

Memorial shrine in Cagayan de Oro, Philippines

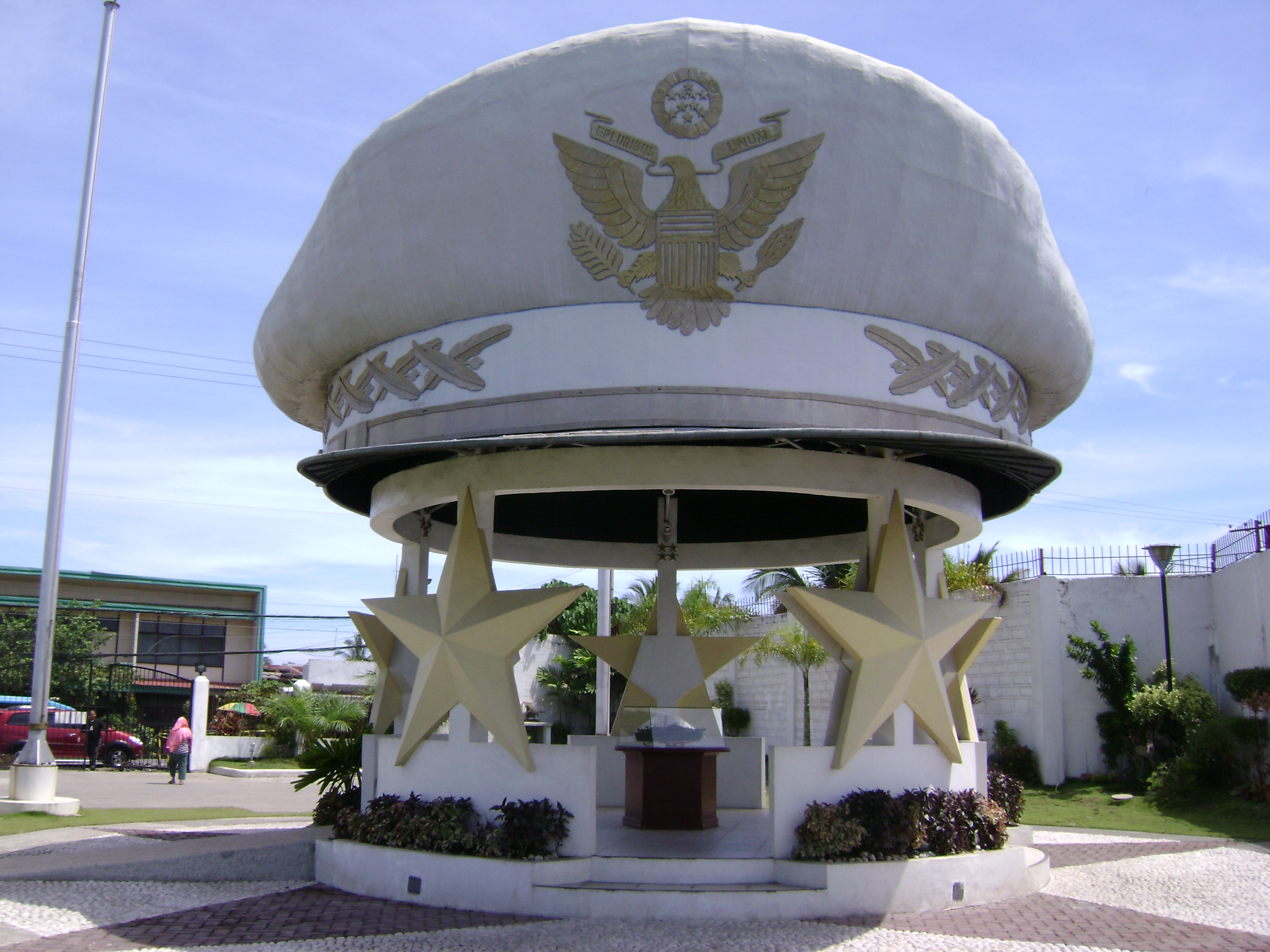
- The shrine in 2010
- Interactive map of MacArthur Memorial Marker
- Location: Port of Macabalan, Cagayan de Oro, Philippines
- Coordinates: 8°30′04″N 124°39′52″E
- Completion date: 2008
- Dedicated to: Douglas MacArthur

The MacArthur Memorial Marker is a shrine dedicated to US General Douglas MacArthur in Cagayan de Oro, Philippines.

The MacArthur Memorial Marker commemorates the arrival of MacArthur in the city at Macabalan wharf who is retreating to Australia amidst the Japanese occupation of the Philippines during the World War II era. Local politician, Constantino Jaraula caused the construction of the Port of Macabalan along with a MacArthur marker and a view deck when he was still president of the Lions Club in 1970. This marker was demolished due to expansion works on the seaport. Another MacArthur marker was built near the site of the previous marker outside the Philippine Ports Authority office in 1994, when Jaraula was serving as Rotary Club president. The MacArthur Memorial Marker itself was inaugurated on March 14, 2008.

The structure features the "scrambled egg hat" of MacArthur. The stars represents MacArthur's military rank as a five-star-general. A replica of a USAFFE PT Boat encased inside a glass is featured at the center of the monument. The marker is recognized as a historical site by the National Historical Commission of the Philippines.
