= Frederick W. Allsopp =

British-US-American author, newspaperman, book collector, and bookstore owner

Fred Allsopp
- Born: Frederick William Allsopp; June 25, 1867; Wolverhampton, Staffordshire, England
- Died: April 9, 1946 (aged 78); Little Rock, Arkansas
- Occupation: Newspaperman
- Known for: Business manager of the Arkansas Gazette

Frederick William Allsopp (June 25, 1867 – April 9, 1946) was a writer, newspaperman, book collector, and bookstore owner.

== Biography ==
Allsopp was born in Wolverhampton, Staffordshire, England. At the age of twelve, his family moved to Prescott, in Nevada County. He sold newspapers during his youth and in 1884, he worked in the printing department of the Nevada County Picayune. At the age of seventeen, he applied for a job at the Arkansas Gazette in Little Rock, where by 1899, he became the business manager. Allsopp presided over the Arkansas Gazette for more than forty years.

Allsopp was an author and was co-owner of Allsopp & Chapple Bookstore in Little Rock. In 1922, he was named chairman of the 'Committee on a Code' of professional ethics of the Arkansas Press Association, and was later named APA historian "for life." He built the Hotel Frederica designed by Theodore M. Sanders and named for his wife Mary Freiderica Chapple Allsopp. Allsop died on April 9, 1946, and is buried in Little Rock's Mount Holly Cemetery. Allsopp Park, in Little Rock, is named in his honor.

== Works ==
- Twenty years in a newspaper office Central printing company, Little Rock, 1907
- The life story of Albert Pike, Parke-Harper news service, Little Rock, 1920
- History of the Arkansas Press for a Hundred Years and More 1922
- Little Adventures in Newspaperdom 1922
- Rhyneries 1924
- Rimeries 1926
- The Poets and Poetry of Arkansas by Fred W. Allsopp 1933
- Folklore of Romantic Arkansas (2 volumes; New York: The Grolier Society, 1931
