= Neighborhoods of Little Rock =

Little Rock, Arkansas is home to numerous neighborhoods. See List of Little Rock Neighborhoods for an exhaustive list.

== Capitol View/Stifft's Station ==
Capitol View/Stifft's Station is a neighborhood in Little Rock, located in the west-central portion of the city, encompassing approximately 1500 homes. Roughly, its boundaries include the area south of West Markham Street, north of Interstate 630, east of Pine, and west of Summit, as well as south of Riverview between Park and Summit. Capitol View/Stifft's Station is just west of Downtown, north of the Central High School Historic District, Southeast of Pulaski Heights and uses the 72205 ZIP code. The neighborhood is the result of Little Rock's early 20th century westward growth. Located west of the Arkansas State Capitol, Capitol View and Stifft's Station were the combined result of numerous additions to, what was at the time, western Little Rock.

The architecture of the neighborhood is predominantly Craftsman or Bungalow with Tudor or Colonial Revival detailing. One may also find Shotgun Houses, Queen Anne or American Foursquare-styled homes, as well as various period revival influences including Spanish Colonial Revival Style architecture. The dominance of these styles in the neighborhood reflects its principal growth period of 1920 to 1929, with roughly 40% of building stock constructed within this decade. Combined with construction undertaken in the 1930s, this period accounts for the majority of housing stock built within the neighborhood. Although construction of Interstate 630 in the 1970s dramatically altered the southern edges of the area, the neighborhood is largely intact and much of the original housing stock remains.

== Chenal Valley ==
A sizable and more recently-developed section of the city, Chenal Valley is in the west-central section of Little Rock, known as West Little Rock. Its name is derived from the area's Shinall Mountain, but Deltic Timber Corporation, a major early developer of the area, opted to alter the name to mimic French language as part of a strategy (known as foreign branding) to orient the residential and commercial development toward upper-class population segments. Chenal Valley is one of the more expensive residential areas in Little Rock with typical homes in the $200,000 to $2,000,000 price range.

The main thoroughfare is Chenal Parkway, mostly a divided four-lane path chiefly connecting Highway 10 to west Little Rock's Financial Centre business district. Chenal Parkway's northwestern terminus is just north of Highway 10 at Highway 300, near the Pinnacle Valley neighborhood. The southeastern terminus lies at Autumn Road at a transition to Financial Centre Parkway, with continuation to a conversion into Interstate 630 at Shackleford Road.

== East Little Rock ==
Predominantly industrial in development, East Little Rock generally refers to most portions of Little Rock located east of Interstate 30. The low-lying easternmost end of Arkansas's capital city is marked by distribution facilities and warehouses, Clinton National Airport and its environs, the Port of Little Rock, and various manufacturers. A small amount of residential areas can also be found dispersed throughout East Little Rock, progressing towards census-designated places including College Station and Sweet Home. Industrial use of this area started as early as 1917, when the US government contracted with a chemical company to produce picric acid to sell to the French government for weapons. Labor was brought in from other states and Puerto Rico.

Physically and economically, East Little Rock often contrasts sharply with the newest, westernmost neighborhoods of Little Rock. The two parts of the city are linked via Interstate 630, which has its first west-bound access near East 15th Street.

Part of East Little Rock has received tremendous attention since the late 2004 opening of the William J. Clinton Presidential Center and Park near the banks of the Arkansas River. Development and subsequent opening of the facility and its adjoining Clinton School of Public Service, affiliated with the University of Arkansas, has served as a catalyst in plans to further improve its immediate area along the riverfront and downtown's River Market District. The next major addition for East Little Rock, the new headquarters of Heifer International adjacent to the Clinton Library campus, opened on January 30, 2006.

== Governor's Mansion District ==
The Governor's Mansion and its grounds comprise a city block, dividing Center Street in its 1800-numbered block, and anchor the city's Governor's Mansion Historic District, encompassing many homes and businesses along and around lower Broadway. The first official residence of Arkansas's governors opened on January 10, 1950, to a week-long open house for all Arkansans. The Georgian Colonial Revival home was renovated and expanded from 2000 through 2002, reopening for the inauguration of Mike Huckabee's second full term as governor in early 2003. The exterior of the Arkansas Governor's Mansion was featured on Designing Women, shown as the home of Suzanne Sugarbaker.

== The Heights and Hillcrest ==
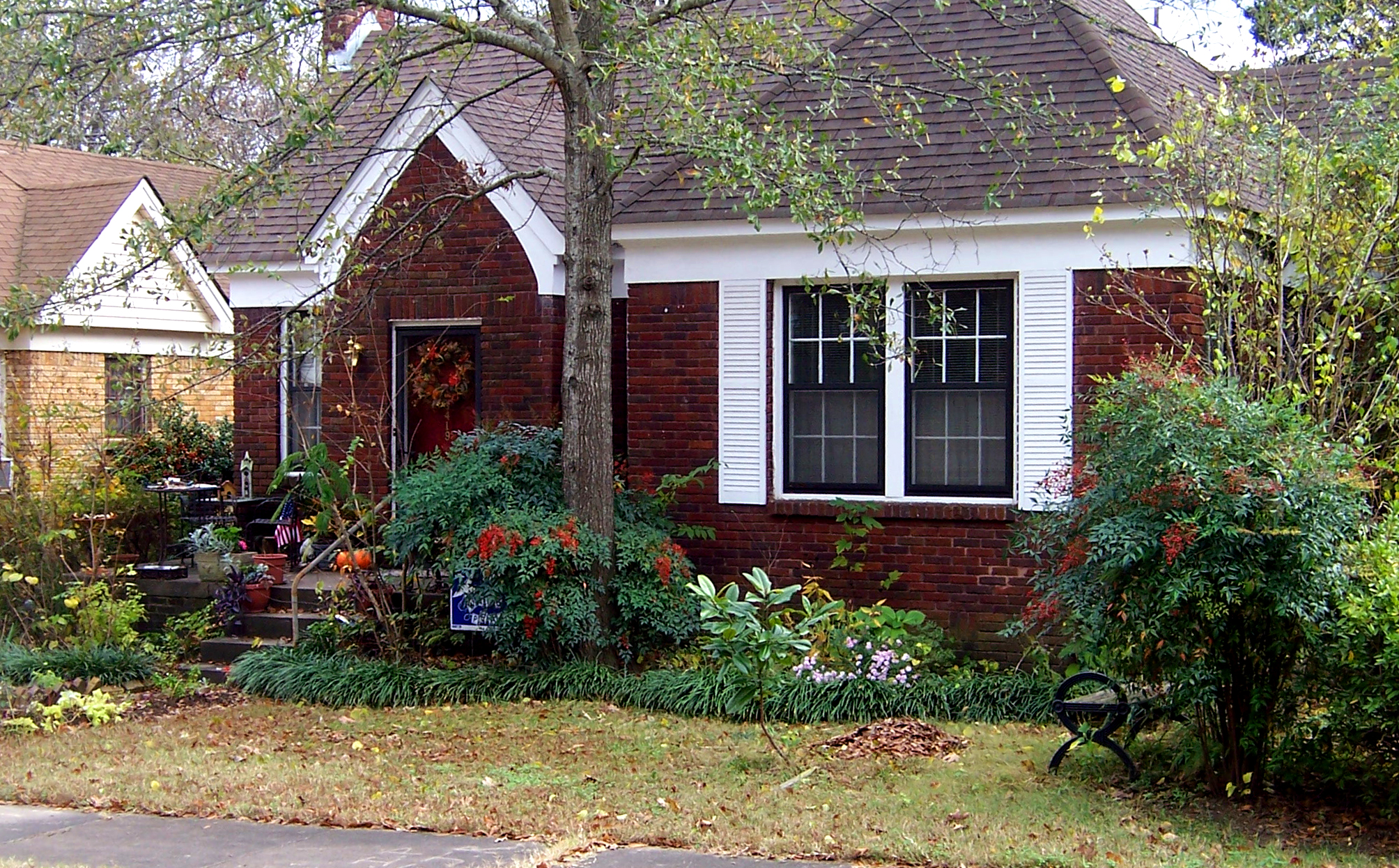
Hillary Rodham and Bill Clinton lived in this 980 square foot (91 m^{2}) house in the Hillcrest from 1977 to 1979 while he was Arkansas Attorney General.

The Heights and Hillcrest are neighborhoods in the north-central portion of Little Rock. Although distinct today, they were once part of the same Little Rock suburb called Pulaski Heights. Pulaski Heights first developed in the 1890s, was incorporated in 1903, and was annexed by Little Rock in 1916.

Today, the Heights is an upper-middle-income residential neighborhood. It is marked by boutiques and restaurants along Kavanaugh Boulevard, St. John's Seminary, and the Country Club of Little Rock. Hillcrest likewise centers around a section of Kavanaugh Boulevard. It is sometimes described as the "funkier" cousin of the Heights. Its landmarks include Mount St. Mary Academy, Allsopp Park, several major churches, and restaurants and bars.

== Mabelvale ==
Mabelvale was a small, unincorporated train station town in southwestern Pulaski County until being annexed into Little Rock in the late 1970s or early 1980s. The area today is part of Little Rock's seventh ward, while retaining a separate postal designation and ZIP code from most of the rest of the city. The neighborhood is currently represented on Little Rock's City Board of Directors by Brenda "B.J." Wyrick. The neighborhood is generally defined as the homes and businesses in the immediate area surrounding the intersection of Mabelvale Main Street and the Union Pacific railroad line. Its location on the south-central fringe of Little Rock proper—as well as proximity to unincorporated communities, neighborhoods in southwest Little Rock and adjoining towns such as Shannon Hills (which shares its zip code)—often leads to varying definitions of Mabelvale's boundaries.

== MacArthur Park District ==
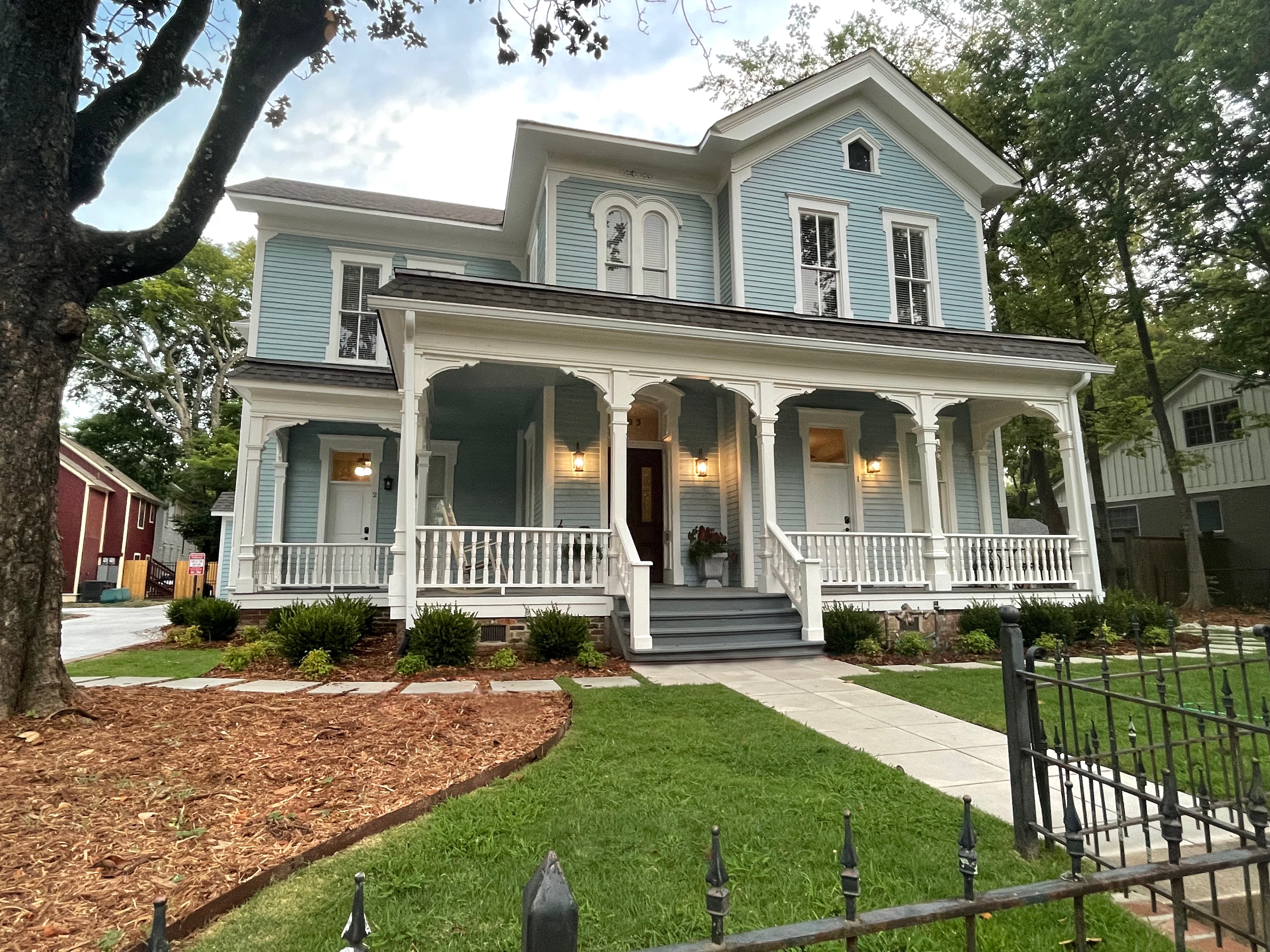
The Karcher House in the MacArthur Park District

The MacArthur Park Historic District, dedicated in 1981, adjoins the city's MacArthur Park along East 9th Street, including the Arkansas Arts Center and the circa-1840 Tower Building of the Little Rock Arsenal, the birthplace of General Douglas MacArthur, a foremost commander of American forces in the Pacific Theater during World War II.

== Quapaw Quarter ==
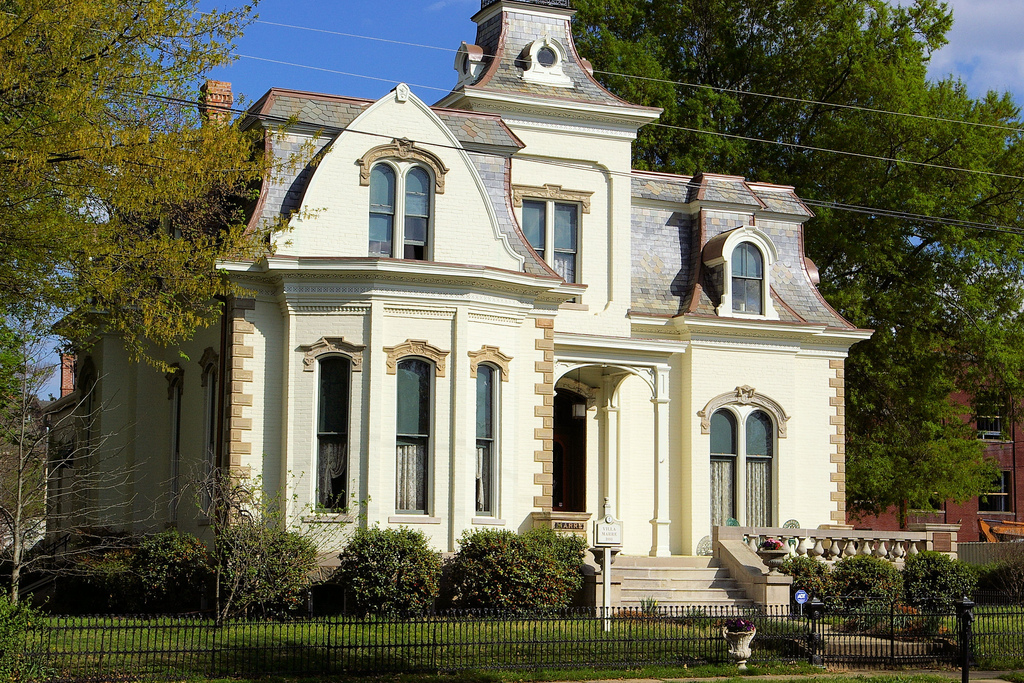
Villa Marre in the Quapaw Quarter District

The Quapaw Quarter of Little Rock is a section of the city including its oldest and most historic business and residential neighborhoods. The name of the area was first given in 1961, honoring the Quapaw Indians who once lived in the area centuries ago.

As many as fifteen separate National Historic Register Districts make up the Quapaw Quarter, including more than 200 separate homes and buildings on the National Register of Historic Places. Trapnall Hall, situated along East Capitol Avenue, was among the first of the homes built in 1843 as the home of early state legislator Frederic Trapnall and his wife, Martha. Structures housing businesses on Main Street and Broadway south of Interstate 630 are among this group as well.

Throughout the Quapaw Quarter, many small and large homes from the Antebellum and Victorian eras can be found, in addition to several examples of Craftsman-style architecture. Scott, Center and Spring streets, in particular, are where many such homes stand today. The exterior of the Villa Marre, one such home, was known nationally as the outside of the home containing the office of Sugarbaker Designs, the fictional Atlanta-based interior design firm on the CBS sitcom Designing Women. The actual home is located along Little Rock's Scott Street, and has been a former home for the office of the Quapaw Quarter Association, the chief organization that sponsors historic preservation efforts in the area.

== South Main Residential Historic District ==
The South Main Residential Historic District was added to the National Register of Historic Places in 2007 according to the Department of Arkansas Heritage. The district, which runs along South Main Street between 12th and 24th Streets, is notable for its assortment of quality late-nineteenth and early twentieth century residential architecture, including Queen Anne, Craftsman and Colonial Revival styles.

== List of Little Rock Neighborhoods ==
- Alpine
- Andover Square
- Apple Gate
- Big Rock
- Birchwood
- Breckenridge
- Broadmoor
- Brodie Creek
- Briarwood
- Cammack Village
- Candlewood
- Capitol Hill
- Capitol View/Stifft's Station
- Carmel
- Central High School Neighborhood Historic District
- Cherry Creek
- Chenal Ridge
- Chenal Valley
- Cloverdale
- College Station
- Colony West
- Crystal Valley
- Dunbar (Paul Laurence Dunbar School Neighborhood Historic District)
- Downtown
- East End
- East Little Rock
- East Roosevelt
- East Village
- Echo Valley
- Fair Park
- Fourche Dam/Port Little Rock
- Fox Croft
- Genevia
- Geyer Springs
- Gibraltar Heights
- Granite Mountain
- Governor's Mansion Historic District
- Gum Springs,
- Hall High
- Hanger Hill
- The Heights
- Highland Park
- Hillcrest
- Hillsborough
- John Barrow
- Kingwood
- Leawood
- Mabelvale
- MacArthur Park
- Marlowe Manor
- Meadowbrook
- Meadow Cliff
- M.L.K.
- Midtown
- Mushroom Pass
- Oak Forest
- Otter Creek
- Overlook
- Palisades
- Parkway Place,
- Pankey
- Pecan Lake
- Pettaway
- Pleasant Forest
- Pleasant Valley
- Pinedale
- Pinnacle Valley
- Prospect Terrace
- Pulaski Heights
- Quail Run
- Quapaw Quarter
- River Mountain
- River Ridge
- Riverdale
- Robinwood
- Rock Creek
- Rockport
- Rolling Pines
- Rosedale
- Sandpiper Creek
- St. Charles
- St. Michael
- Santa Fe Heights,
- South Main "SoMa"
- Historic South End District
- Southwest Little Rock
- Shannon Hills
- Sherrill Heights
- Spring Valley
- Stagecoach
- Sturbridge
- Terrytown
- Town and Country
- Treasure Hills
- University Park
- The Villages of Wellington
- West Ninth Street
- Wakefield
- Walnut Valley
- Walton Heights
- Ward
- West End
- West Little Rock
- Westwood
- Windamere
- Wood Creek
- Woodlands Edge
- Wright Avenue
