= Albert Retan House =

Historic house in Arkansas, United States

- U.S. National Register of Historic Places
- U.S. Historic district – Contributing property
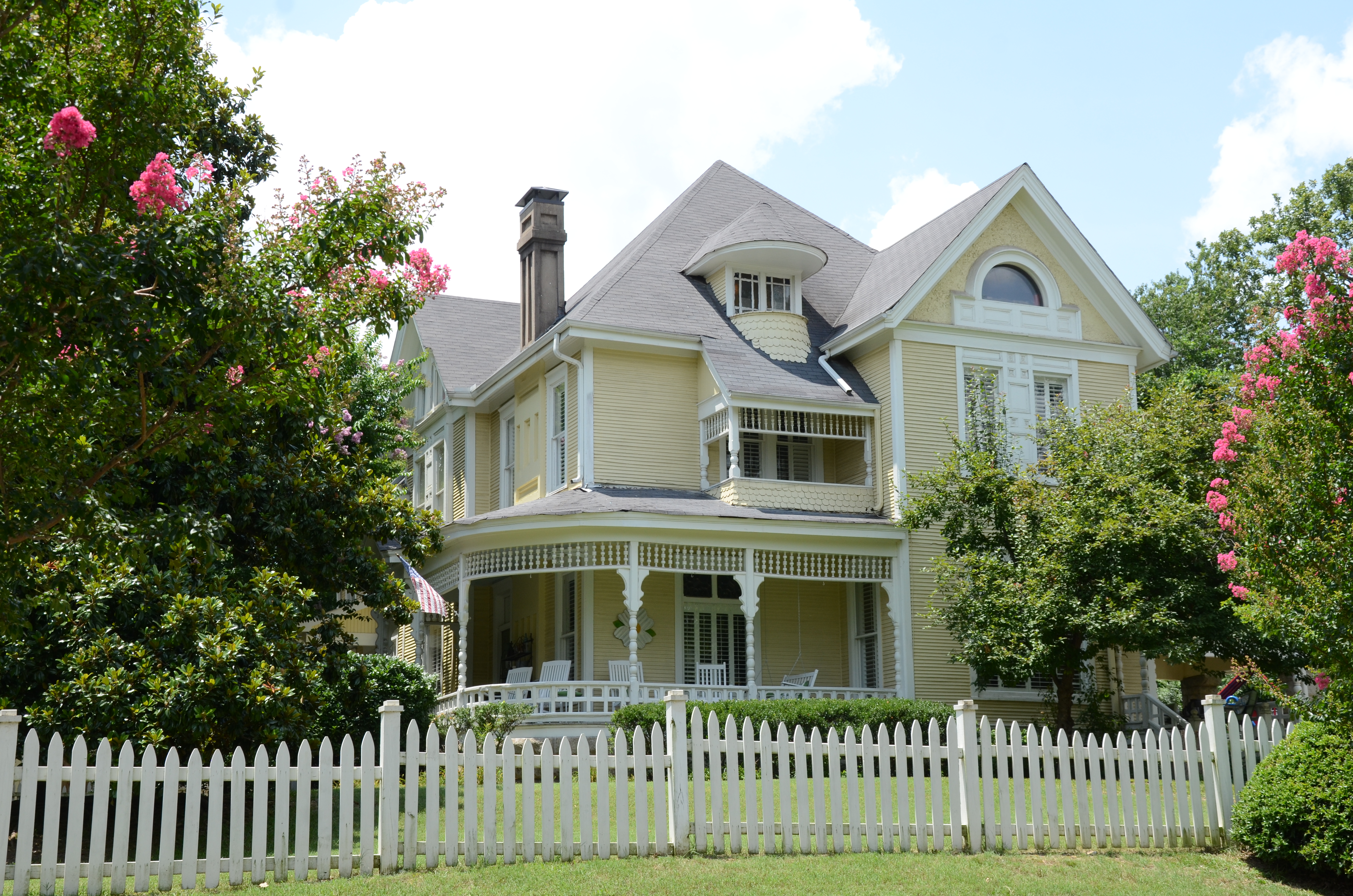

- Location within Arkansas Location within the United States
- Location: 506 N. Elm St., Little Rock, Arkansas
- Coordinates: 34°45′18″N 92°19′7″W
- Area: less than one acre
- Built: 1893
- Architectural style: Colonial Revival, Queen Anne
- Part of: Hillcrest Historic District (ID90001920)
- NRHP reference No.: 80000784

Significant dates
- Added to NRHP: December 3, 1980
- Designated CP: December 18, 1990

The Albert Retan House is a historic house at 506 North Elm Street in Little Rock, Arkansas. The house is a 2 1/2-story wood-frame structure, with a complex cross-gabled hip roof configuration studded by gabled projections. The exterior is finished in wooden clapboards, and it has a single-story wraparound porch with turned posts and delicate woodwork balustrade and spindled frieze. The house was built in 1893 for Albert Retan, an early investor in the Pulaski Heights subdivision where it stands.

The house was listed on the National Register of Historic Places in 1980.

== See also ==
- National Register of Historic Places listings in Little Rock, Arkansas
