= God's Word Translation =

English translation of the Bible translated by the God's Word to the Nations Society

- A presentation edition of a GOD'S WORD Bible
- Full name: God's Word Translation
- Abbreviation: GW
- Complete Bible published: 1995
- Textual basis: NT: Nestle-Aland Greek New Testament 27th edition. OT: Biblia Hebraica Stuttgartensia.
- Translation type: Closest Natural Equivalence
- Publisher: God's Word to the Nations Mission Society
- Copyright: 1995, 2003, 2013, 2014, 2019, 2020
- Website: godsword.org
- Genesis 1:1–3 In the beginning God created heaven and earth. The earth was formless and empty, and darkness covered the deep water. The Spirit of God was hovering over the water. Then God said, “Let there be light!” So there was light. John 3:16 God loved the world this way: He gave his only Son so that everyone who believes in him will not die but will have eternal life.

The God's Word Translation (GW) is an English translation of the Bible. God's Word to the Nations Mission Society managed and funded the translation.

== History ==
The God's Word Translation of the Bible was produced by the God's Word to the Nations Bible Mission Society in Cleveland, Ohio, which relocated in April 2005 to the Jacksonville, Florida, metro area. Although many of its board members were affiliated with the Lutheran Church–Missouri Synod (LCMS), the society has no official ties to this specific Christian denomination. GW had its beginnings with a New Testament translation titled The New Testament in the Language of Today: An American Translation, published in 1963 by LCMS pastor and seminary professor William F. Beck (1904–1966).

According to Michael Hackbardt, Executive Director of the society since June 1992, Beck had not completed the Old Testament portion of his Bible prior to his death in 1966, but was awaiting textual suggestions from two colleagues, Elmer Smick, Professor of Old Testament at Gordon Conwell Theological Seminary, and Erich Kiehl of Concordia Seminary. Smick and Kiehl ensured it was published posthumously in 1976 as An American Translation (AAT).

In 1978, it was decided that Beck's translation would be revised. Phillip B. Giessler, a pastor from Cleveland, Ohio, formed a committee and revision work began in 1982. The work of Giessler's committee (although it was—much like Dr. Beck's earlier work—essentially a "one-man" translation team with a single English reviewer) yielded another translation of the New Testament that was released in 1988 as the New Testament: God's Word to the Nations (GWN) This work was later renamed the New Evangelical Translation (NET) in 1990. However, according to Hackbardt, Beck's AAT served only as a basis for "English style". In early 1992, according to Hackbardt, all the earlier New Testament work was abandoned by the Society and an entirely new Bible translation based on the best Hebrew, Aramaic, and Koine Greek texts, and using the translation principle "closest natural equivalence"—beginning with the Old Testament—was completely re-translated by the society's 5 scholars, 17 technical reviewers, and 4 English reviewers. In early 1994 the translation was renamed GOD'S WORD prior to being turned over to World Bible Publishers of Iowa Falls, Iowa, in October 1994.

The God's Word Translation was released by World Publishing in March 1995. The publishing rights were acquired in June 2003 by Green Key Books of Holiday, Florida, and in 2008, rights to the translation were acquired by Baker Publishing Group.

In January 2016, God’s Word to the Nations Mission Society ended its publishing arrangement with Baker Publishing Group and began to market and make the God's Word Translation available for licensing and for custom Bible, evangelism, and mission resources to ministries and parachurch organizations.

== Translation theory ==
GW uses a dynamic equivalence translation methodology it calls "Closest Natural Equivalence". Its publishers believe that communicating the original meaning of the Hebrew, Aramaic, and Greek texts that comprise the Scriptures such that everyone can comprehend requires taking a completely new look at the original languages. Many modern translations, they argue, have chosen simply to follow the traditions of older accepted translations, though the traditional words and grammar may no longer mean what they once did, or are not understood.

Closest natural equivalent translation (CNE) provides readers with a meaning in the target language that is equivalent to that of the source language. It seeks to express that meaning naturally, in a way that a native English speaker would speak or write. Finally, it expresses the meaning with a style that preserves many of the characteristics of the source text.

CNE does not, however, attempt to make all books or passages function on the same level. The more difficult books of the Bible are translated to the same level of difficulty as the original languages. In addition, abstract concepts in Greek and Hebrew are translated into abstract concepts in English, and concrete concepts remain concrete in translation.

About their translation, GW translators claim:

Traditionally, the Scriptures have been translated into English by teams of scholars serving part-time. This translation project employed full-time biblical scholars and full-time English editorial reviewers. God's Word is the first English Bible in which English reviewers were actively involved with scholars at every stage of the translation process. Because of the involvement of English experts, God's Word looks and reads like contemporary American literature. It uses clear, natural English; follows standard punctuation and capitalization rules; and is printed in an open, single column format that enhances readability. And, the poetry is extraordinary. All of this makes God's Word an exceptional literary work.
