= The Pulaskian =

American weekly newspaper

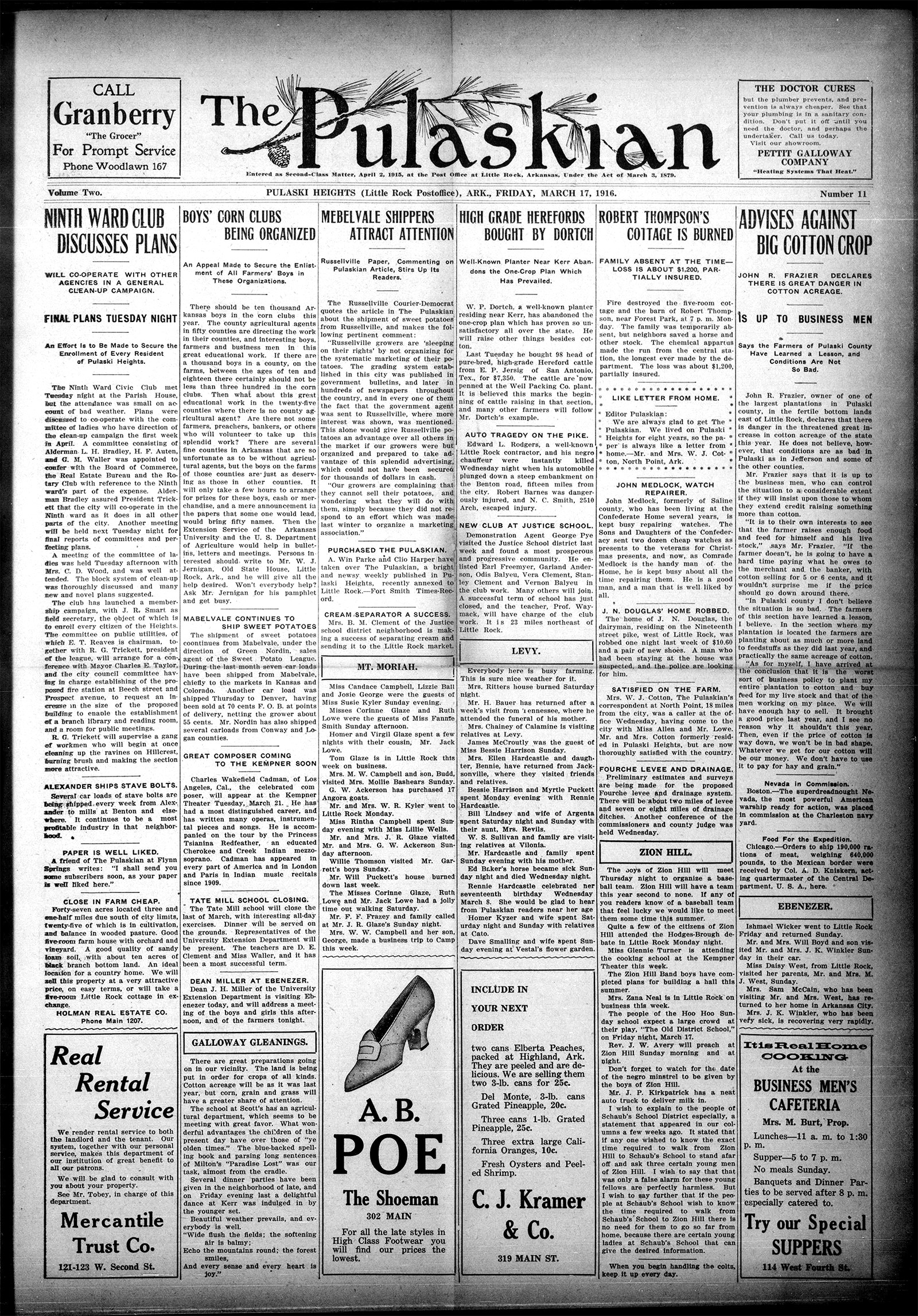
- Front page of the Pulaskian weekly newspaper from March 17, 1916.
- Type: Weekly newspaper
- Format: Broadsheet
- Founder(s): John C. Small
- Publisher: Parke & Harper
- Founded: 1915; 110 years ago
- Ceased publication: 1929; 96 years ago
- Country: United States
- ISSN: 2833-5295
- OCLC number: 1343016617

The Pulaskian was a short-lived newspaper, published in Pulaski County, Arkansas from 1915 to 1929.

== History ==
The paper was founded by John C. Small, a resident of the Pulaski Heights neighborhood on the then-outskirts of Little Rock, Arkansas in Pulaski county. Small sold the paper to Parke and Harper Publishers in 1916, one year after starting the publication. The new publishing company was owned by Augustus Winfred Parke and Clio Armitage Harper, with the latter being a prominent citizen and active in many of the other local newspapers of the day. The paper was originally released once per week on Friday, but was moved to Thursday in 1920. The paper focused on local news and legal proceedings, but did have a world focus during World War I.

William F. Beck, known for his Pea Ridge Pod publication, moved to nearby Maumelle and began writing for the Pulaskian in 1917. Frederick W. Allsopp, another prominent man of Little Rock, noted in his History of the Arkansas Press for a Hundred Years and More in 1922, that Beck's "The Pod" drew praise from Puck magazine, The New York Times, and great men, including the president, governors and congressmen." Allsopp's book was published by the same company as the Pulaskian, Parke and Harper Publishing.

== Preservation ==
Today, copies of the historical newspaper are kept in the University of Arkansas special collections in Fayetteville, Arkansas, available by advance notice only.
