= William F. Beck =

American Lutheran minister (1904-1966)

William Frederick Beck (August 28, 1904 – October 24, 1966) was an American Lutheran minister best known for his biblical translation, The Holy Bible, An American Translation.

== Biography ==
William Frederick Henry Beck was born in Little Falls, Minnesota. He was the son of Paul Friedrich Gustav Beck (1869-1950) and Mary Marie Josephine (Butschke) Beck (1873-1964). His father was a Lutheran minister. He graduated from Concordia College in Moorhead, Minnesota, in 1924, Concordia Seminary in Clayton, Missouri in 1927. He returned to the seminary to earn a Th.D. in 1956. He subsequently taught courses at the seminary. In 1959 he published an English translation of Gospel texts, entitled The Christ of the Gospels.

His New Testament translation was first published during 1963. At the time of his death in 1966, he had finished the first draft of the Old Testament. Elmer Smick of Gordon Conwell Theological Seminary and Erich Kiehl of Concordia Seminary recommended certain revisions. The text with these revisions was published together with the New Testament as The Holy Bible in the Language of Today, An American Translation in 1976.

His work was the first translation of the Bible into English completed by a Lutheran minister. To commemorate that achievement, a copy was placed in the Lutherhaus in Wittenberg, Germany, on January 1, 1976. He had hoped that the Lutheran Church–Missouri Synod would adopt it as their official translation, but this did not happen. Beck also worked as a technical advisor for several Hollywood films that had Biblical themes. He died in St. Louis, Missouri, and was buried at the Lakewood Cemetery in Minneapolis, Minnesota.

Beck briefly wrote of his time in Arkansas, publishing in his own paper the Pea Ridge Pod and later for the Pulaskian, a weekly newspaper in Little Rock, Arkansas.

== Works ==
- William F. Beck, The New Testament in the Language of Today (St. Louis, Missouri: Concordia Publishing House, 1963)
- William F. Beck et al., The Holy Bible in the Language of Today, An American Translation (New Haven, Missouri: Leader Publishing Co., 1976)

== See also ==
- God's Word Translation
