= Brodie Creek =

Neighborhood in Little Rock, Arkansas, United States

Coordinates: 34°42′40″N 92°24′31″W

Brodie Creek is a traditional residential neighborhood in west Little Rock, Arkansas with close proximity to Interstate 430, Bowman Rd, Kanis Rd, Chenal Pkwy, and Col Glenn Rd.

Brodie Creek has about 80 uniquely-designed homes along tree-lined streets, all radiating from a central, open green space and pavilion. Houses range from 1,800 to 4,000 square feet, all meeting strict architectural standards set by the original town architect, John Allison. The majority of homes feature large front porches and rear-facing garages, accessed via private alleyways.

Brodie Creek adjoins Woodlands Edge on its west side, Sandpiper Creek to the east, Cherry Creek to the north, and Colonel Glenn to the south. Portions of the Financial Centre business district, Baptist/Kanis Road medical district, and Chenal Valley lie to the north.

The neighborhood lies within the zoning area for Baker Elementary, and Joe T. Robinson Middle School and High School.
