= Reid House (Little Rock, Arkansas) =

Historic house in Arkansas, United States

- U.S. National Register of Historic Places
- U.S. Historic district – Contributing property
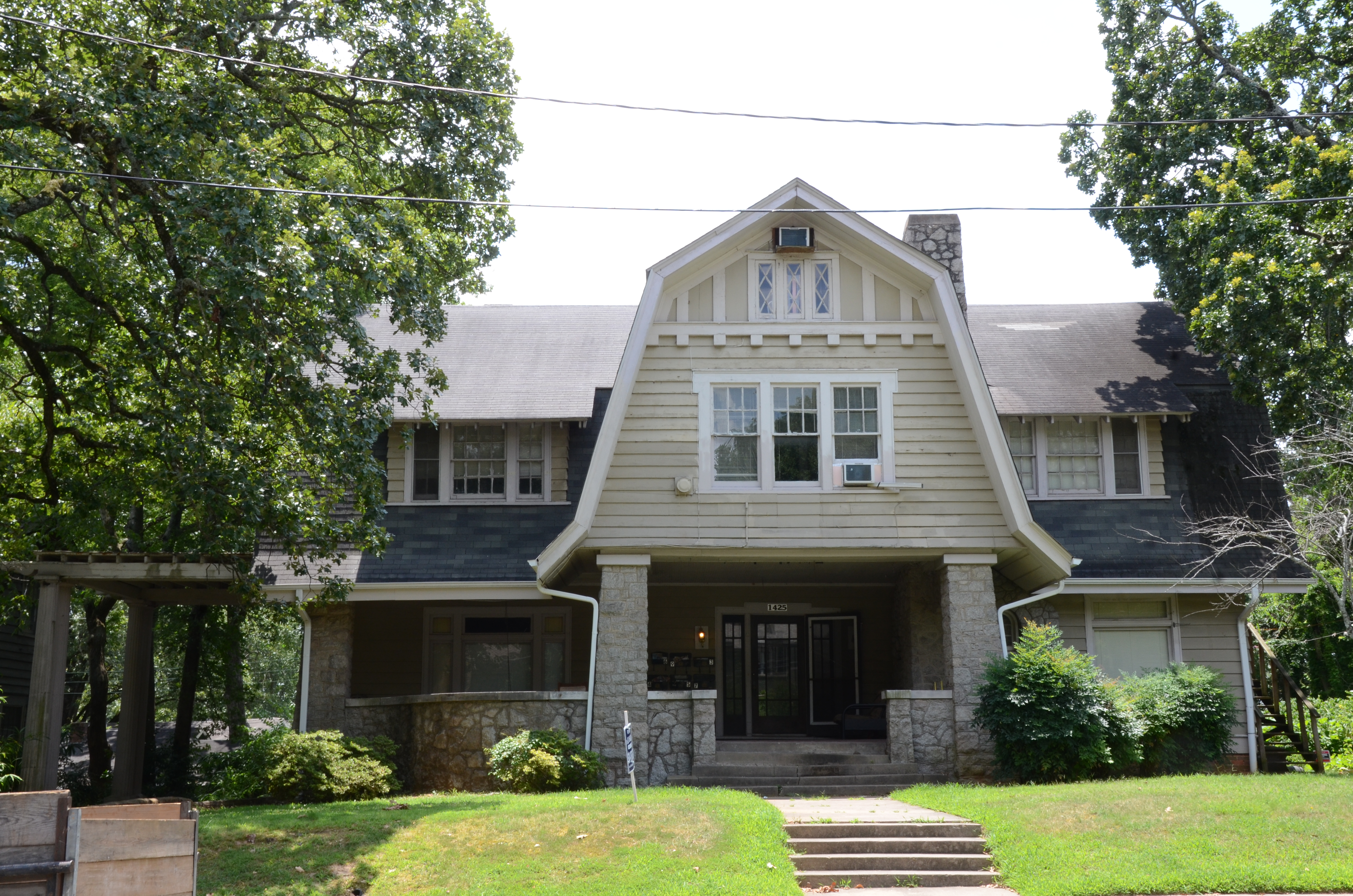

- Location within Arkansas Location within the United States
- Location: 1425 Kavanaugh St., Little Rock, Arkansas
- Coordinates: 34°45′17″N 92°18′30″W
- Area: less than one acre
- Built: 1911
- Architect: Charles L. Thompson
- Architectural style: Colonial Revival, Dutch Colonial
- Part of: Hillcrest Historic District (ID90001920)
- MPS: Thompson, Charles L., Design Collection TR
- NRHP reference No.: 82000916

Significant dates
- Added to NRHP: December 22, 1982
- Designated CP: December 18, 1990

The Reid House is a historic house at 1425 Kavanaugh Street in Little Rock, Arkansas, United States. It is a large two-story wood-frame structure, built in 1911 in the Dutch Colonial style to a design by architect Charles L. Thompson. It has a side-gable gambrel roof that extends over the front porch, with shed-roof dormers containing bands of sash windows flanking a large projecting gambreled section. The porch is supported by stone piers, and extends left of the house to form a porte-cochere.

The house was listed on the National Register of Historic Places in 1982.

== See also ==
- National Register of Historic Places listings in Little Rock, Arkansas
