= Capitol View/Stifft's Station =

Neighborhood of Little Rock, Arkansas

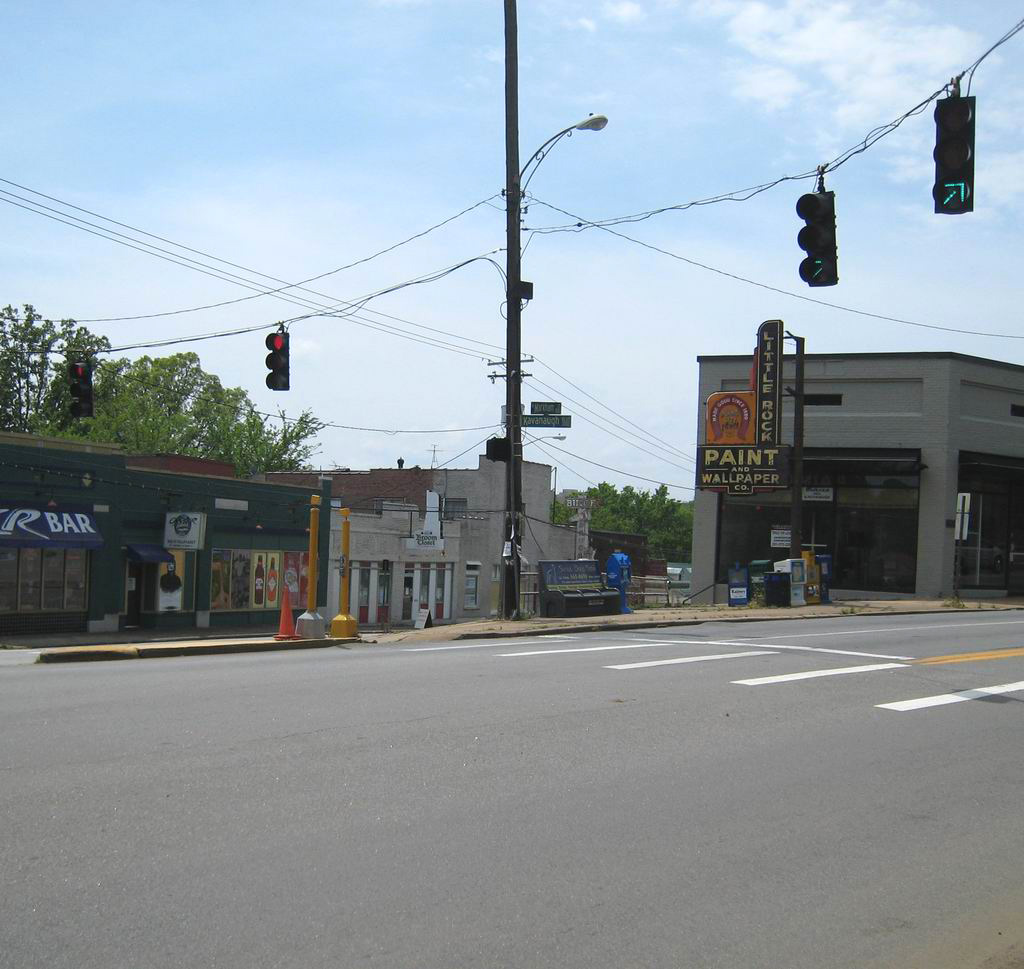
At the intersection of Kavanaugh and Markham on the northern edge of Capitol View/Stifft's Station.

Capitol View/Stifft's Station is a neighborhood of Little Rock, Arkansas, in the west-central portion of the city with approximately 1500 homes. Roughly, its boundaries include the area south of West Markham, north of Interstate 630, east of Pine, and west of Summit, as well as south of Riverview between Park and Summit. Capitol View/Stifft's Station is just west of Downtown, north of the Central High School Historic District, southeast of Pulaski Heights and uses the 72205 ZIP code.

== History and architecture ==
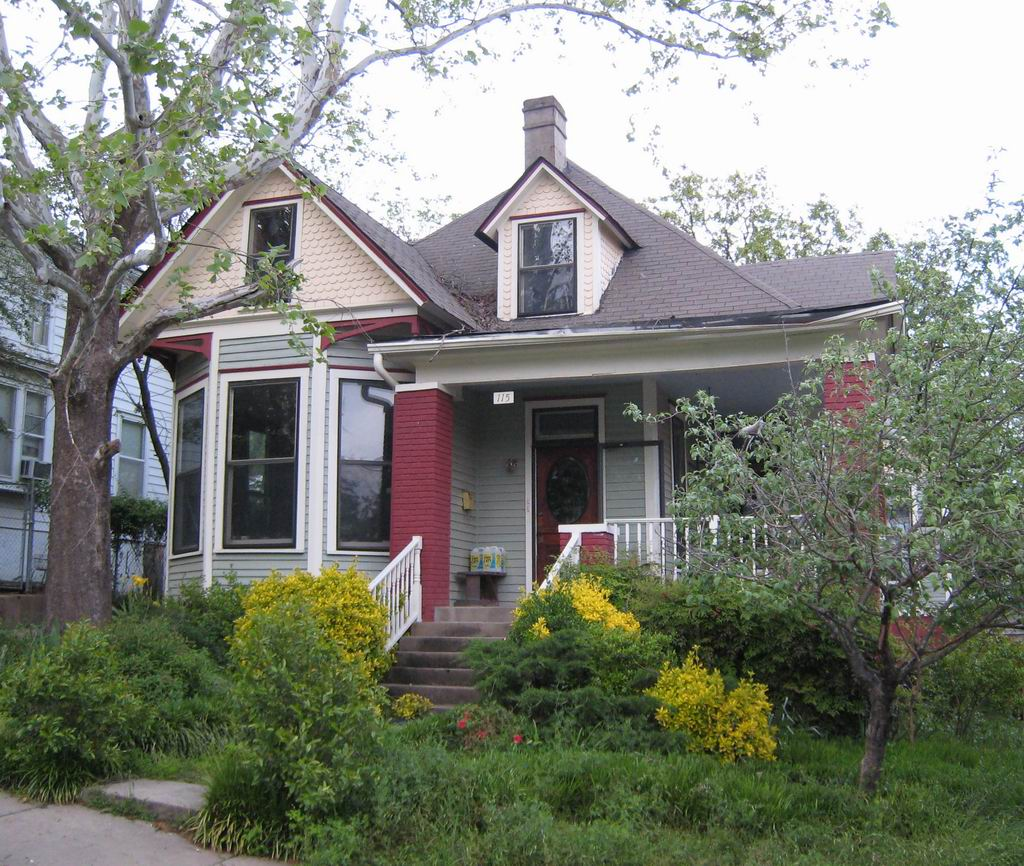
Queen Anne style architecture is exemplified by this house at 115 S Dennison.

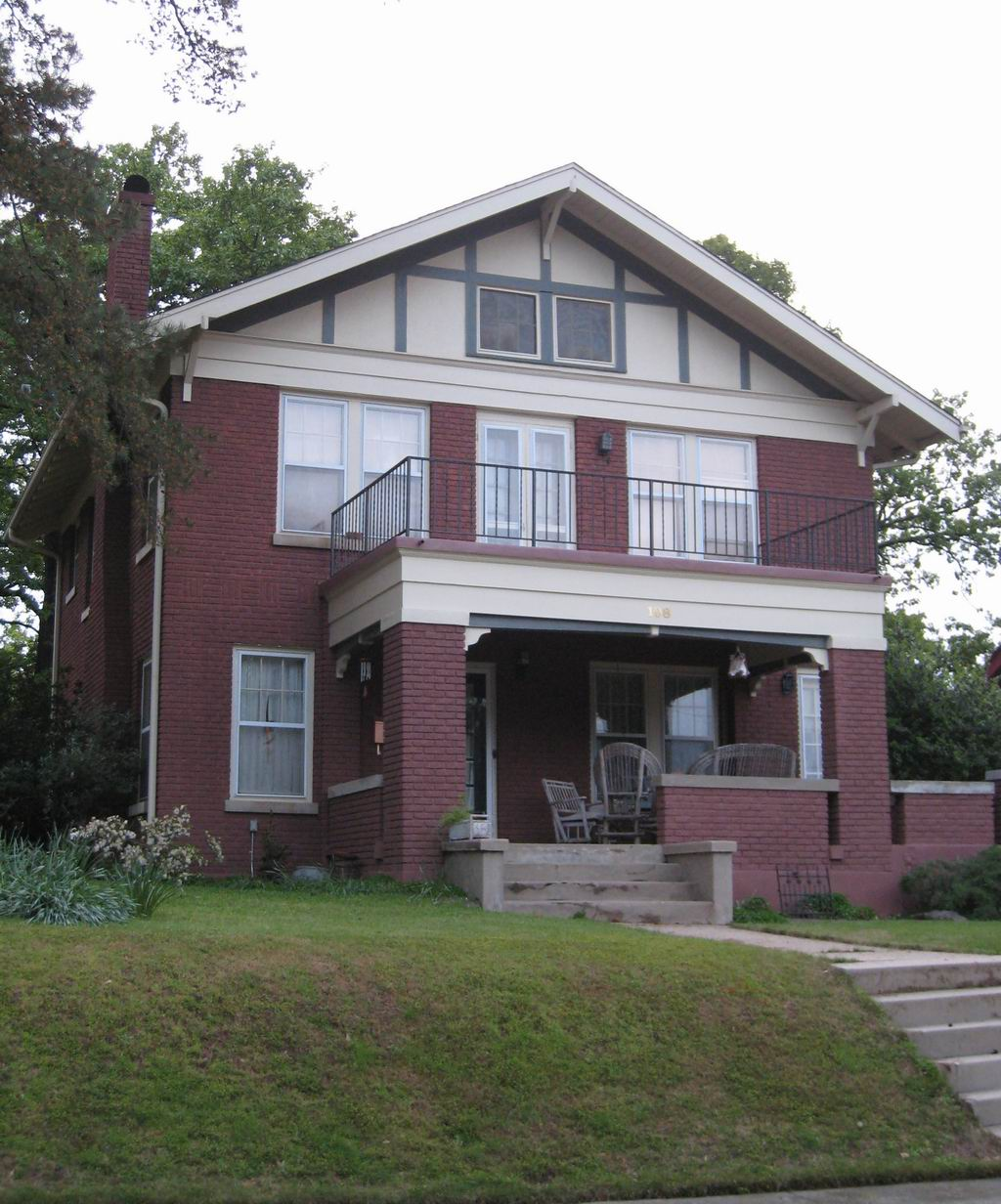
This home at 108 Thayer exemplifies American Foursquare architecture with English Revival-style details.

The Capitol View/Stifft's Station neighborhood is the result of Little Rock's early 20th century westward growth. Located west of the Arkansas State Capitol, Capitol View and Stifft's Station were the combined result of numerous additions to, what was at the time, western Little Rock.

The architecture of the neighborhood is predominately Craftsman, Craftsman Bungalow, and Bungalow with modest Tudor or Colonial Revival detailing; One may also find Shotgun Houses, Queen Anne or American Foursquare styled homes, as well as various period revival influences including Spanish Colonial Revival Style architecture. The dominance of these styles in the neighborhood reflects its principal growth period of 1920 to 1929 with roughly 40% of building stock constructed within this decade. Combined with construction undertaken in the 1930s, this period accounts for the majority of housing stock built within the neighborhood. Although construction of Interstate 630 in the 1970s dramatically altered the southern edges of the area, the neighborhood is largely intact and much of the original housing stock remains.

There are architecturally and historically significant structures and sites which merit preservation and protection within the area. Two structures in the area are listed on the National Register of Historic Places, the T.R. McGuire House and Lamar Porter Field.

The T.R. McGuire House, located at 114 Rice Street, is a 1904 Colonial Revival cottage executed in structural concrete blocks. Although there are several Colonial Revival cottages throughout the area, The T.R. McGuire House is exemplary as a triumph in concrete block construction.

Lamar Porter Field, developed as a Works Progress Administration project, consists of a stadium and ball field which has historically served as the center of activity and social gatherings for the neighborhood. The facility was constructed on property donated by the Porter family and now owned by the Billy Mitchell Boys and Girls Club. The neighborhood also contains two historic districts: the Capitol View Historic District and the Stifft Station Historic District.

=== Capitol View Historic District ===
- Capitol View Neighborhood Historic District
- U.S. National Register of Historic Places
- U.S. Historic district
- Location within Arkansas Location within the United States
- Location: Roughly bounded by Riverview Dr., Schiller St., W. 7th St. and Woodrow St., Little Rock, Arkansas
- Coordinates: 34°45′0″N 92°18′08″W
- Built: 1900
- Architect: Mayer, Max; Johnson, Yandell, et al.
- Architectural style: Bungalow/Craftsman, Colonial Revival
- NRHP reference No.: 00000813
- Added to NRHP: March 13, 2001

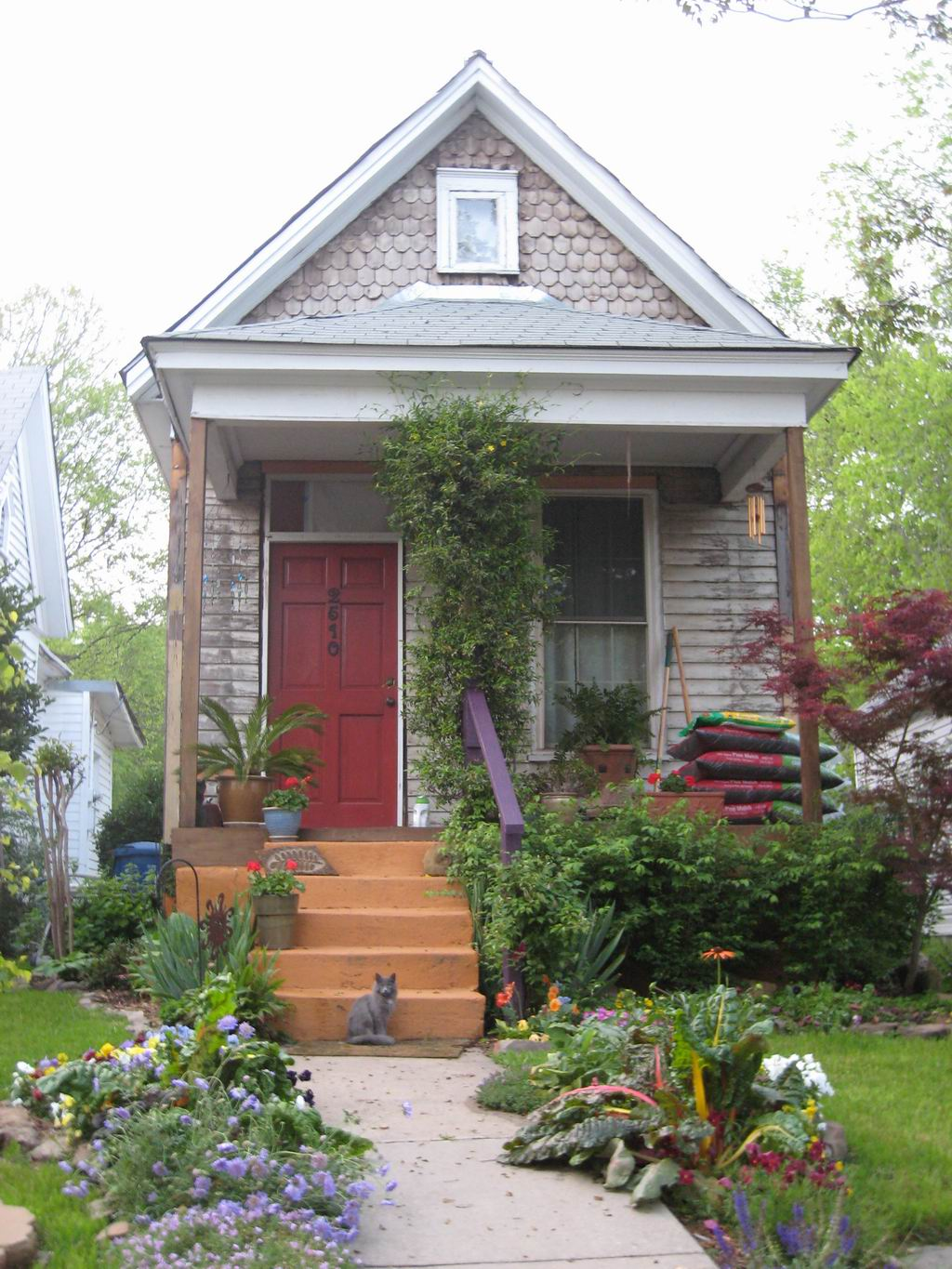
This shotgun house on West Sixth Street was likely built for a railroad employee

Capitol View is the eastern part of the Capitol View/Stifft's Station neighborhood. The Capitol View Historic District comprises the area east of Woodrow, North of Seventh street or the railroad tracks (whichever is further north), South of Markham, and west of Schiller south of Second Street. North of Second Street, Summit marks the eastern boundary. Between Park and Summit, the area extends north to include the area between Markham and Riverview.

The Capitol View Historic District is contained within Section 4, Township 1 North, and Range 12 West of Little Rock, Arkansas. Its most distinctive features include a river view from a bluff high above the Arkansas River as well as, appropriately, a view of the Arkansas State Capitol from numerous vantage points both north and south of Markham Street, which bisects the district and divides it into two unequal parts. Its varied topography, characterized by substantial variation in elevation enhances the possibilities of scenic overlooks and, no doubt, was a principal attraction for developers in the late nineteenth and first quarter of the twentieth century. The district has remained almost exclusively residential in character throughout its history. A handful of duplexes, three apartment buildings and a pair of grocery stores are the only exceptions among the 501 buildings included in the Capitol View historic district.

The architecture of the Capitol View Historic District is, like the entire Capitol View/Stifft's Station neighborhood, predominately Craftsman, Craftsman Bungalow and Bungalow with modest Tudor or Colonial Revival detailing. Building scale and decorative detailing is generally homogeneous; its limited variation is reflective of a similarly homogeneous residential character as an enclave of modest homes for middle and working-class individuals. Forested pockets of hardwoods and evergreens remain as present-day reminders of the wooded appeal of this area and its welcome change from the increasingly developed “Original City of Little Rock”. Or as an Arkansas Gazette reporter observed in 1915, like Pulaski Heights, this hilly terrain "...owe(d) much of its fame for beauty of landscape to the pines, those majestic green robed sentinels that stood watch over the hill and vale long before the city dwellers came hence to build their bungalows and chicken coops."

As of 2004, 269 of the 501 properties included in the district (54%) are contributing historic buildings, 181 (36%) are non-contributing historic buildings (altered or synthetically sided) and 51 (10%) are non-contributing buildings constructed since 1950.

The additions or portions of additions included within the Capitol View Historic District, listed chronologically according to the dates they were first platted, are: Worthen's Subdivision, Capitol Hill Extension, Plunkett's Second Addition, the northwest corner of E.M. Phillips Addition, Ferndale Addition, Capitol View and Union Depot (platted the same year), Virginia Heights, Young's Park and Bodman's Addition.

The Capitol View Historic District provides a glimpse of an almost exclusively residential neighborhood intended for middle and working-class residents. Time has wrought its changes on both the socio-economic and ethnic diversity of the area, though it remains solidly middle-class in many sections. Like other mid-town neighborhoods such as the Central High Historic District to the south, inadequate maintenance, conversion of larger homes to multi-unit rental property, and, consequently, deterioration due to short-term rental residency, as well as the prevalent application of artificial siding have taken their toll. Nonetheless, its handsome housing stock, the absence of commercial intrusion, reasonable real estate prices and an active neighborhood association have invigorated its renewal and encouraged its residents’ allegiance to these neighborhoods both north and south of Markham. Moreover, features which made these properties attractive to buyers in the first quarter of the century retain their draw still as the century draws to its close—proximity to the downtown business district, plentiful shade trees and, for those homeowners along the ridge overlooking the river, a panoramic view of the Arkansas River.

=== Stifft Station Historic District ===
- Stifft Station Historic District
- U.S. National Register of Historic Places
- U.S. Historic district
- Location within Arkansas Location within the United States
- Location: Bounded by W. Markham, W. 7th, Woodrow and Martin Sts., Little Rock, Arkansas
- Coordinates: 34°45′0″N 92°18′29″W
- Built: 1906
- Architect: Theodore Sanders
- Architectural style: Late 19th and 20th Century Revivals, Late 19th and Early 20th Century American Movements
- NRHP reference No.: 06000941
- Added to NRHP: October 18, 2006

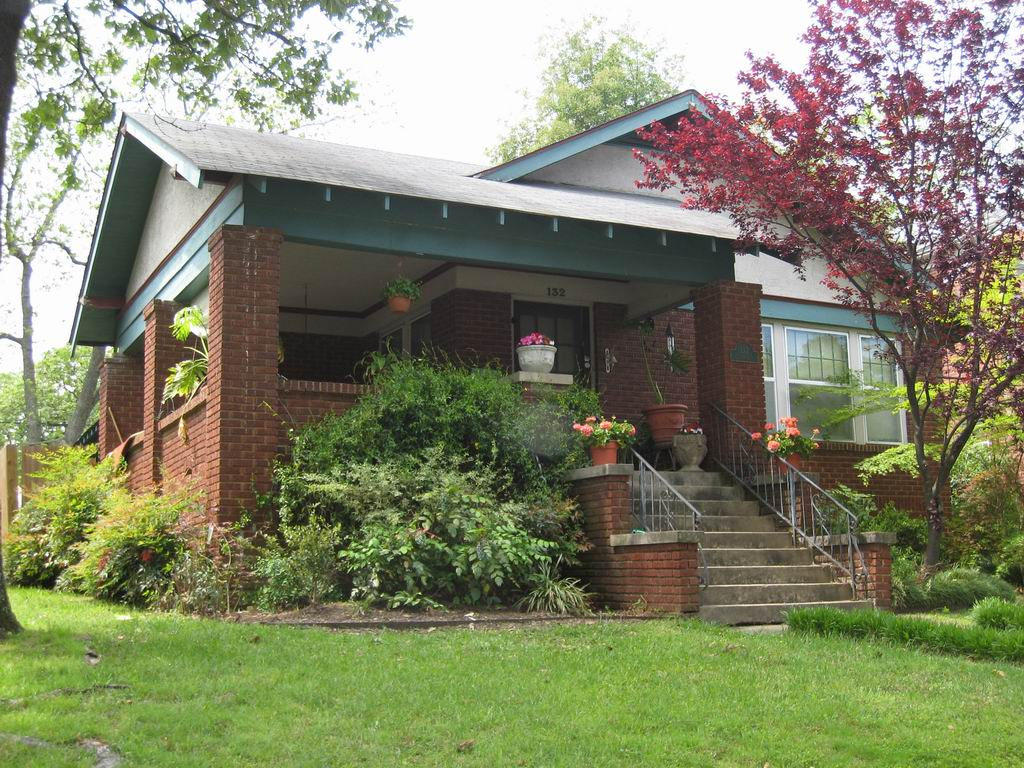
A local example of Craftsman Bungalow architecture.

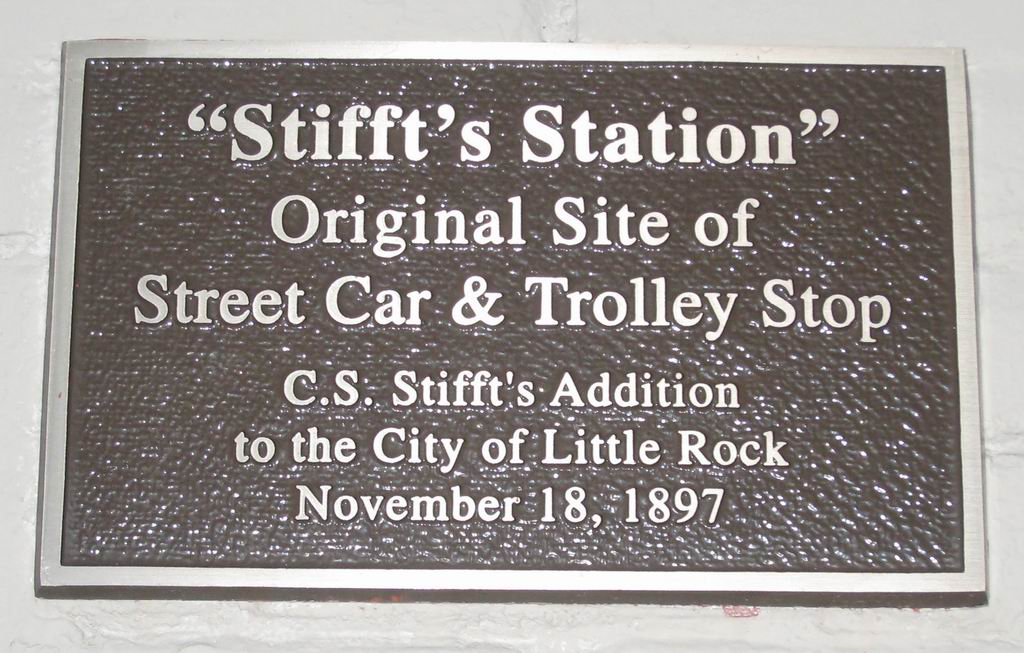
Commemorative sign at Kavanaugh and Markham

Stifft's Station makes up the western part of the Capitol View/Stifft's Station neighborhood. The historic district is rectangular in configuration and is bounded by a historically significant traffic artery, Markham, on the north, Woodrow (formerly May) on its eastern edge, 7th Street along its southern perimeter and Martin forming the western boundary. The neighborhood remains one of mixed use, though primarily residential in character, and includes a commercial band along Markham distinguished by storefronts and freestanding commercial structures. The commercial development along the Northern edge of the district is complemented by additional non-residential development along the Southern boundary. Specifically, the Little Rock School District's Woodruff Elementary School, designed in 1911 by Theo M. Sanders, sits in the Southeast corner of the district while the Billy Mitchell Boys and Girls Club is its neighbor to the North and Lamar Porter Field (NR 12-06-90) is positioned to its immediate west.

One surmises that the name of Stifft's Station was derived from the development of the Stifft Addition and the active participation of the prominent local businessman and civic booster Charles Stifft in the growth of this portion of Little Rock's streetcar suburbs. It appears on the 1929 map of the “Street Railways of Little Rock” at the intersection of Markham and Prospect Avenue (now Kavanaugh), where a trolley stop was located on the Pulaski Heights Line. Additionally, the city directory from that same year records the operation of two neighborhood businesses which included “Stifft Station” in their names — one a grocery store and the other a barber shop—-which underscores the adoption of the name generally. Because the area retains this name and identity, it is the obvious choice for the district's appellation.

There are 295 structures included in the Stifft Station Historic District, 238 are contributing while another 57 are considered non-contributing, principally because of condition rather than date of construction with two already included individually on the National Register of Historic Places. Consequently, the district can boast of an extraordinary 81% of contributing to non-contributing structures. The district sits alongside the southern portion of the Capitol View Historic District, notably sharing a boundary along Woodrow with the Young's Park and Ferndale Additions.

The additions or portions of additions within the Stifft Station Historic District, listed chronologically according to the dates when they were first platted are: C.O. Kimball and Bodemann Addition (1890), Beach Addition (1893), C.H. Taylor Addition (1895), Boone's Addition (1896), Stifft's Addition (1898), Feild's Addition (1911), Hick's Subdivision of Block 4 of Boone's Addition (1912), E.F. Feild Addition (1926). It is also noteworthy that despite its platting in the late nineteenth century, according to city directory listings and Sanborn maps, the first houses were not built on these lots until after 1910.

City directories, Sanborn maps, abstract records and other historical sources help to paint a picture of the neighborhood. Even the Billy Mitchell Boys and Girls Club with its playground and open spaces serves as a reminder of fields and woods where the children of Stifft Station Historic District played as their neighborhood grew from a sprinkling of scattered houses in the first years of the twentieth century to the fully realized and largely stable neighborhood it remains today.

In 1996, approximately two percent of the City of Little Rock's residents called the Capitol View/Stifft's Station area home. The racial distribution within the neighborhood is similar to that of the city: approximately 34 percent black and just under 65 percent white. However, also like the city, the neighborhood is subdivided geographically into different socio-economic zones. An example of this stratification is that almost 52 percent of the households in the area are classified as low and moderate income; however, the westernmost quarter of the neighborhood is over 61 percent low and moderate income, while 60 percent of the "Johnson - Woodrow area" households are higher income.

Over 53 percent of the Capitol View/Stifft's Station area households were at an income level, in 1990, between $10,000 and $30,000. This compares to 38.1 percent of the households in Little Rock while, at the upper end, only 9.6 percent of households in the area had incomes over $50,000. The citywide percent of households with incomes over $50,000 was 22.2 percent in 1990.

The population profile of the neighborhood, in 1996, showed an area more middle-aged than that of Little Rock (residents aged over 65 and less than 18 both represented a lesser percentage than that of the overall city population). In addition, the female population is slightly larger in the area than citywide (54.4 to 53.6 percent). Single parent households also account for a greater percentage of neighborhood households than citywide. All of the increases in single parent households come from female headed households. For the city, 11.4% of households are single parent homes. Family and household sizes are generally smaller in Capitol View/Stifft's Station than compared with the rest of the city. This is due in part to the high percentage of one person households (41.8 percent compared to 32 percent citywide). The neighborhood is overwhelmingly single family at over 63 percent.

== City services ==
The Central Arkansas Transit Authority provides bus service in and through the neighborhood. One Downtown to West Little Rock route travels Markham Street to Kavanaugh Boulevard providing residents access to both Downtown and the Rodney Parham Road area. Bus routes along 7th Street and Capitol Avenue provide access to the West Markham Street area and the Otter Creek Neighborhood. The bus system is radial, downtown to the outskirts and back, much like the spokes of a wheel. Therefore, to go east, north or south, the rider must first go downtown and transfer. The Capitol View/Stifft's Station neighborhood has a service level as good as any residential area in metropolitan Little Rock.

Capitol View/Stifft's Station has no fire stations, either historic or modern, within its boundaries. One surmises that this area's fire protection needs were served, initially, by either Fire Station #3, which was opened at 3515 12th in 1911, or Fire Station #7, in operation by 1916 at Beechwood and Prospect (now Kavanaugh).

== Notable places ==
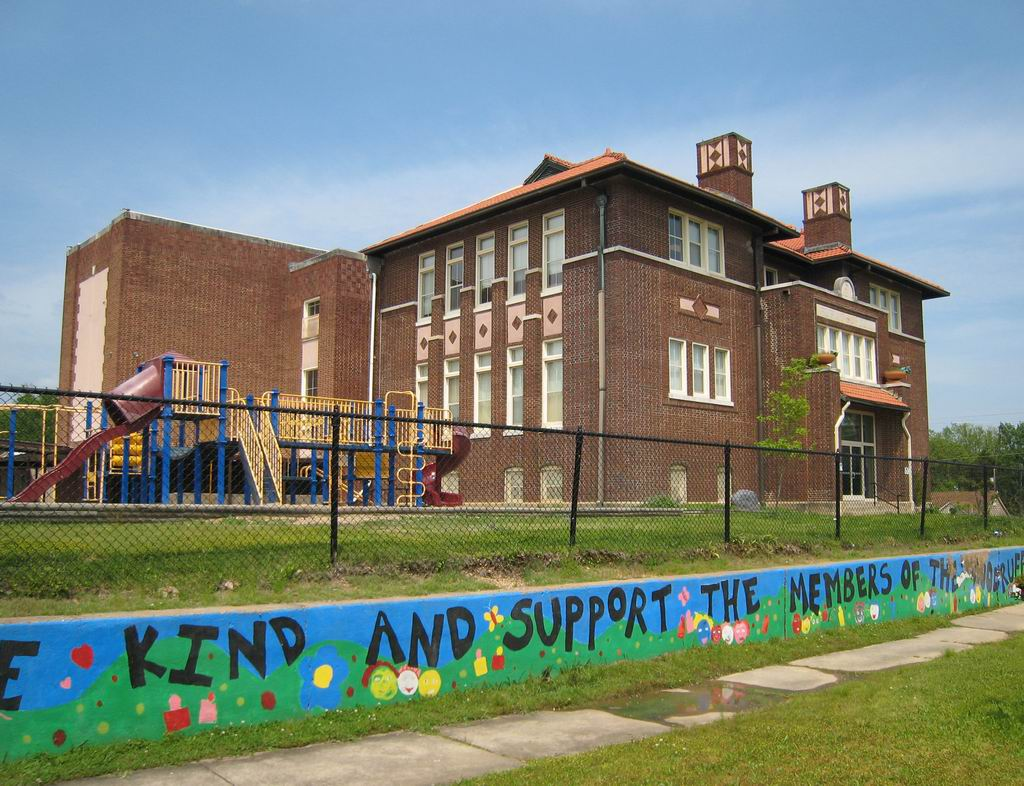
Woodruff Elementary School in the Capitol View Historic District.

=== Schools ===
- Woodruff Elementary School
- Arkansas School for the Blind
- Arkansas School for the Deaf

=== Recreation ===
- The Billy Mitchell Boys and Girls Club
- Lamar Porter Field
