= Werner Knoop House =

Historic house in Arkansas, United States

- U.S. National Register of Historic Places
- U.S. Historic district – Contributing property
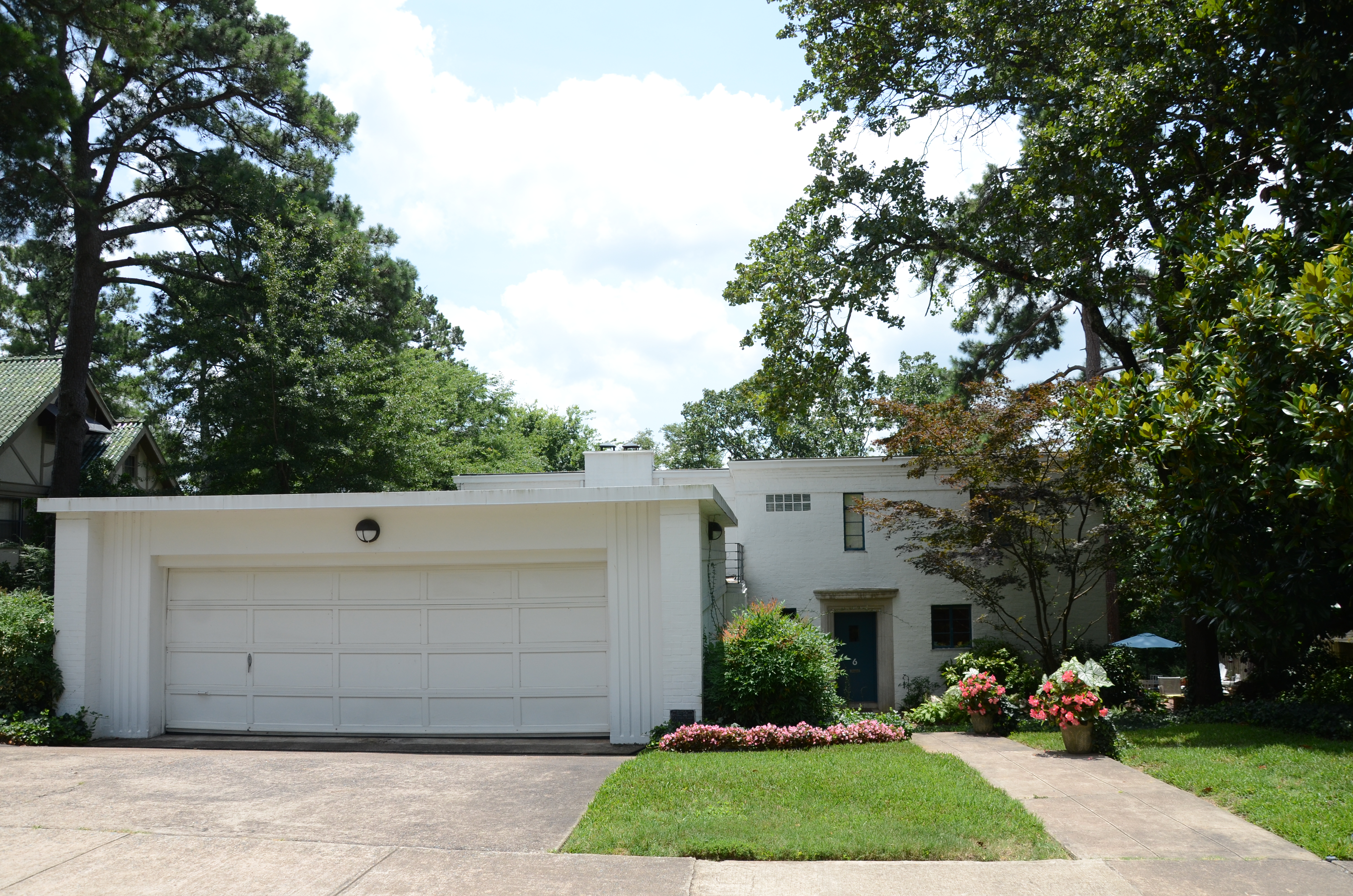

- Location within Arkansas Location within the United States
- Location: 6 Ozark Point, Little Rock, Arkansas
- Coordinates: 34°45′20″N 92°18′18″W
- Area: less than one acre
- Architect: Brueggeman, Swaim & Allen
- Architectural style: Art Moderne
- Part of: Hillcrest Historic District (ID90001920)
- NRHP reference No.: 90001147

Significant dates
- Added to NRHP: August 3, 1990
- Designated CP: December 18, 1990

The Werner Knoop House is a historic house at 6 Ozark Point in Little Rock, Arkansas. Built in 1936–37, it is a rare example of Art Moderne residential architecture in the city. It is a two-story L-shaped structure, its exterior finished in brick with flush mortar joints and painted white, with asymmetrically arranged steel-frame windows in a variety of sizes and shapes. Its entrance is recessed in a rectangular opening framed by stone, immediately to the right of the projecting two-car garage. The house was built for Werner Knoop, owner of a local construction company, to a design by the local firm Brueggeman, Swaim & Allen.

The house was listed on the National Register of Historic Places in 1990.

== See also ==
- National Register of Historic Places listings in Little Rock, Arkansas
