= Thomas R. McGuire House =

Historic house in Arkansas, United States

Coordinates: 34°45′1.01″N 92°17′59.32″W

- U.S. National Register of Historic Places
- U.S. Historic district – Contributing property
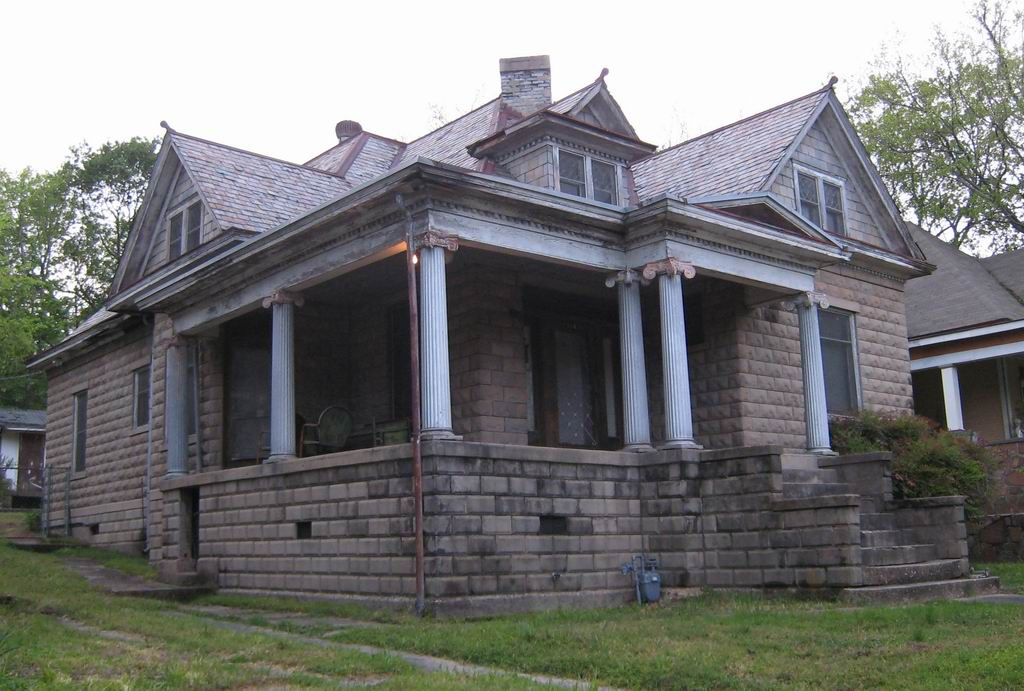
- The Thomas R. McGuire House
- Location: Capitol View Historic District, Little Rock, Arkansas, USA
- Built: 1905–1915
- Architect: Thomas R. McGuire
- Architectural style: Colonial Revival
- Part of: Capitol View Historic District (ID00000813)
- NRHP reference No.: 91001858

Significant dates
- Added to NRHP: December 19, 1991
- Designated CP: March 13, 2001

The Thomas R. McGuire House, located at 114 Rice Street in the Capitol View Historic District of Little Rock, Arkansas, is a unique interpretation of the Colonial Revival style of architecture. Built by Thomas R. McGuire, a master machinist with the Iron Mountain and Southern Railroad, it is the finest example of the architectural style in the turn-of-the-century neighborhood. It is rendered from hand-crafted or locally manufactured materials and serves as a triumph in concrete block construction. Significant for both its architecture and engineering, the property was placed on the National Register of Historic Places on December 19, 1991.

== History ==
McGuire, then in his mid-20s, started building the property in 1904 at lot 4, block 4 of the newly platted Capitol View addition to the City of Little Rock. Using his own plans, he almost singlehandedly erected the entire structure with only minimal help, most notably with installing the massive stone lintel above the front door and erecting the A-frames for the roof. Beyond that, McGuire poured the concrete for the bricks from an immense vat in the front yard. He used clay and molds to form the capitols for the front and side porches, and he installed the oak woodwork inside the structure. He also cut the slate for the roof and the facade.

McGuire's skill with metal-working equipment is evident throughout the house which features handmade metal columns on the front and side porches and two handmade brass light fixtures suspended from the ceiling in the entry foyer and the dining room. The kitchen walls are lined with metal to protect them from kitchen appliance heat. Before city water became available to the area, McGuire had worked out a system to catch rain running off the roof and channel it through a sand-and-charcoal filter system to a holding tank on the back porch.

By 1906, the shell of the building was complete and the McGuires moved in, first living in the back bedroom and kitchen areas as the rest of the house was slowly finished. Two children were born in that bedroom: Thomas Jr. on July 13, 1907, and R.W. on December 23, 1910. The building was substantially finished by 1915 with the completion of the front living room and the entry foyer.

== Architectural details ==
The McGuire house is a 1 1/2-story, cast-concrete block residence on a continuous poured concrete foundation built on a rectangular plan in a vernacular design with Colonial Revival details. The hipped roof and ridge of each gable are topped by metal cresting. A dentil course runs below the cornice all the way around the structure.

The eastern or front facade consists of a gabled roof segment on the north end, a flat-roofed wrap-around porch extending around the south elevation, a dormer with pediment, a projecting porch pediment, and a brick chimney turned 45 degrees to serve fireboxes in four interior rooms. The porch is supported by three cast-iron and metal Greek Ionic columns with molded clay doric capitals. Poured concrete steps lead to a concrete sidewalk; an iron boot scrape is set in the bottom step. The north gable/pediment and adjacent dormer feature two windows, each in slate, as is the entire roof. The dormer is capped with a pediment and a dentil course runs below the cornice. A single window, also with a leaded glass window atop a stationary pane, is set in the north end of the east elevation; another stationary leaded glass window is set on the south wall facing the porch. Two tall sidelights are set adjacent to the front door, which has a large glass pane set into it; a leaded glass transom sits atop the door surrounds. All of the casing is oak. A large stone lintel tops the arrangement. The porch has a pressed tin ceiling and its floor is covered in unglazed tile.

The southern elevation includes the rest of the wrap-around porch and a protruding three-sided gable-roof topped bay. There is one double-hung window on the porch facing south; it features a leaded glass pane over a single pane. A door with two large frames of glass is set in the bay opening onto the porch. A double-hung, one-over-one window is set in the southern and southeastern sides of the bay; two more double-hung, one-over-one windows, featuring single leaded-glass panes, are set in the wall west of the bay.

The western elevation features a gable with twin two-over two windows inset in a wooden casing. The gable/pediment is covered in slate. An almost-full, flat-roofed poured concrete rear porch is supported by four square metal posts with plain metal capitals. A one-over-one, double-hung window is set in the southern end of the elevation, just off the porch. Two doors open onto the back porch; the northernmost door has leaded glass, the other a single pane. Another one-over-one, double-hung window at the northern end of the porch finishes the rear elevation. There is a concrete cistern under the north end of the porch that was used to hold rainwater when the home was first built.

The northern facade features a half porch supported by two smaller columns identical to those on the front porch. It has a flat roof, a pressed-tin ceiling, and a mosaic tile floor. There also is a storage area beneath the porch. The wall projects slightly west of the porch. This gabled bay features two leaded-glass windows atop two single panes of glass within the pediment and at the first-floor level. The central window of the three is slightly wider and has leaded glass in its top pane. Just west of the arrangement is another pair of double-hung, one-over-one windows separated by a similar half column.

The interior walls are constructed of beaverboard; the kitchen walls, now covered by paneling, are encased in sheet metal. Several rooms have pressed tin ceilings. All of the interior trim is oak, as is much of the tongue-and-groove flooring. One striking feature is a beveled glass door to the closet opposite the bathroom door. There are pocket doors between the dining room and the front bedroom.

== See also ==
- National Register of Historic Places listings in Little Rock, Arkansas
