= Boone House (Little Rock, Arkansas) =

Historic house in Arkansas, United States

- U.S. National Register of Historic Places
- U.S. Historic district – Contributing property
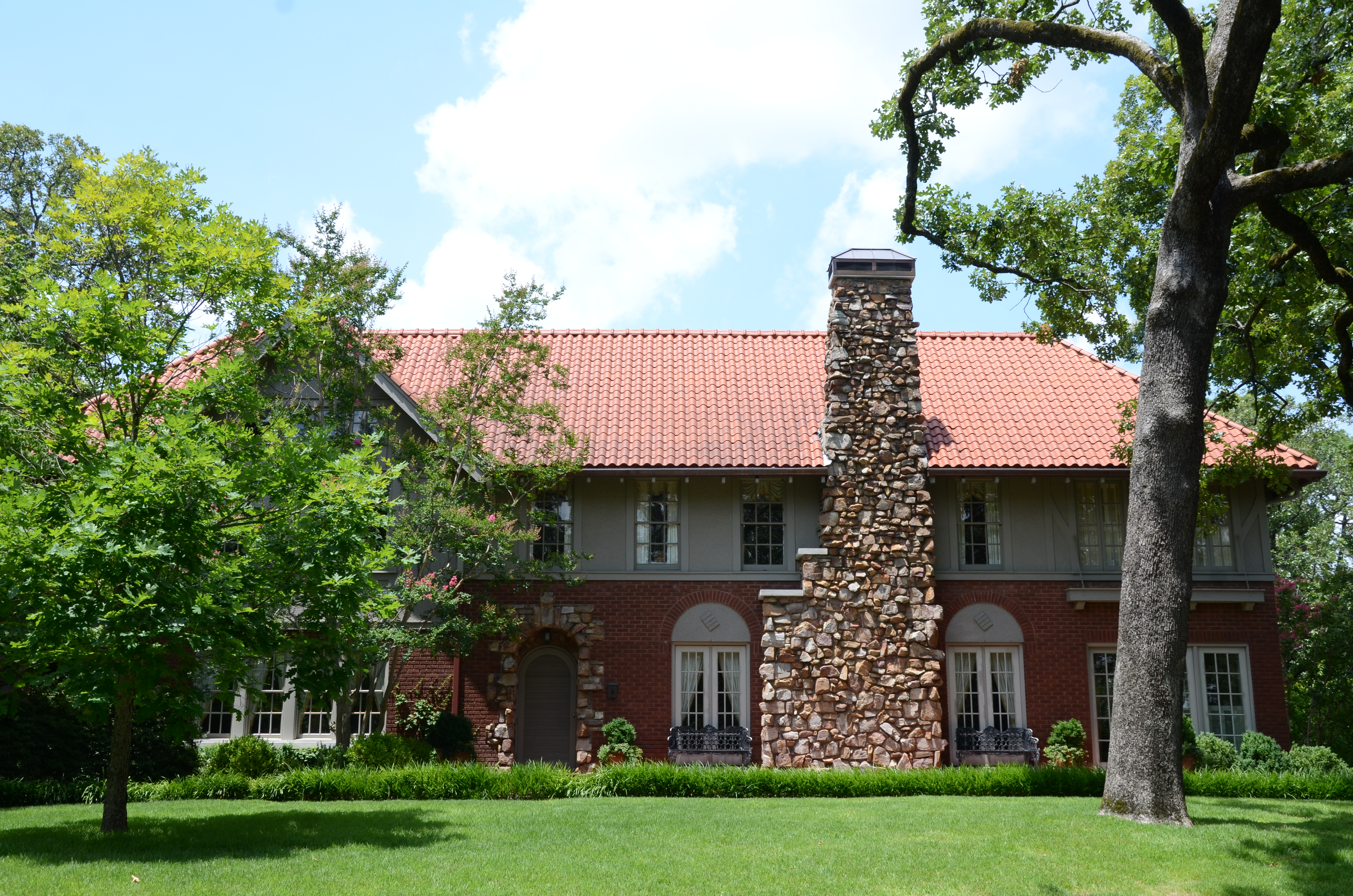

- Location within Arkansas Location within the United States
- Location: 4014 Lookout, Little Rock, Arkansas
- Coordinates: 34°45′48″N 92°19′6″W
- Area: less than one acre
- Built: 1927
- Architect: Thompson & Harding
- Architectural style: Tudor Revival
- Part of: Hillcrest Historic District (ID90001920)
- MPS: Thompson, Charles L., Design Collection TR
- NRHP reference No.: 82000879

Significant dates
- Added to NRHP: December 22, 1982
- Designated CP: December 18, 1990

The Boone House is a historic house located at 4014 Lookout in Little Rock, Arkansas.

== Description and history ==
It is a 2 1/2-story masonry structure, built out of a combination of fieldstone, brick, and stucco. It is constructed in a rusticated Tudor Revival style. The structure was built in 1927 following a design by Thompson & Harding. It has a wide variety of textures to its exterior, and uses earth tones to blend into its relatively rural and wooded landscape.

The house was listed on the National Register of Historic Places on December 22, 1982.

== See also ==
- National Register of Historic Places listings in Little Rock, Arkansas
