= Williamson House (Little Rock, Arkansas) =

Historic house in Arkansas, United States

- U.S. National Register of Historic Places
- U.S. Historic district – Contributing property
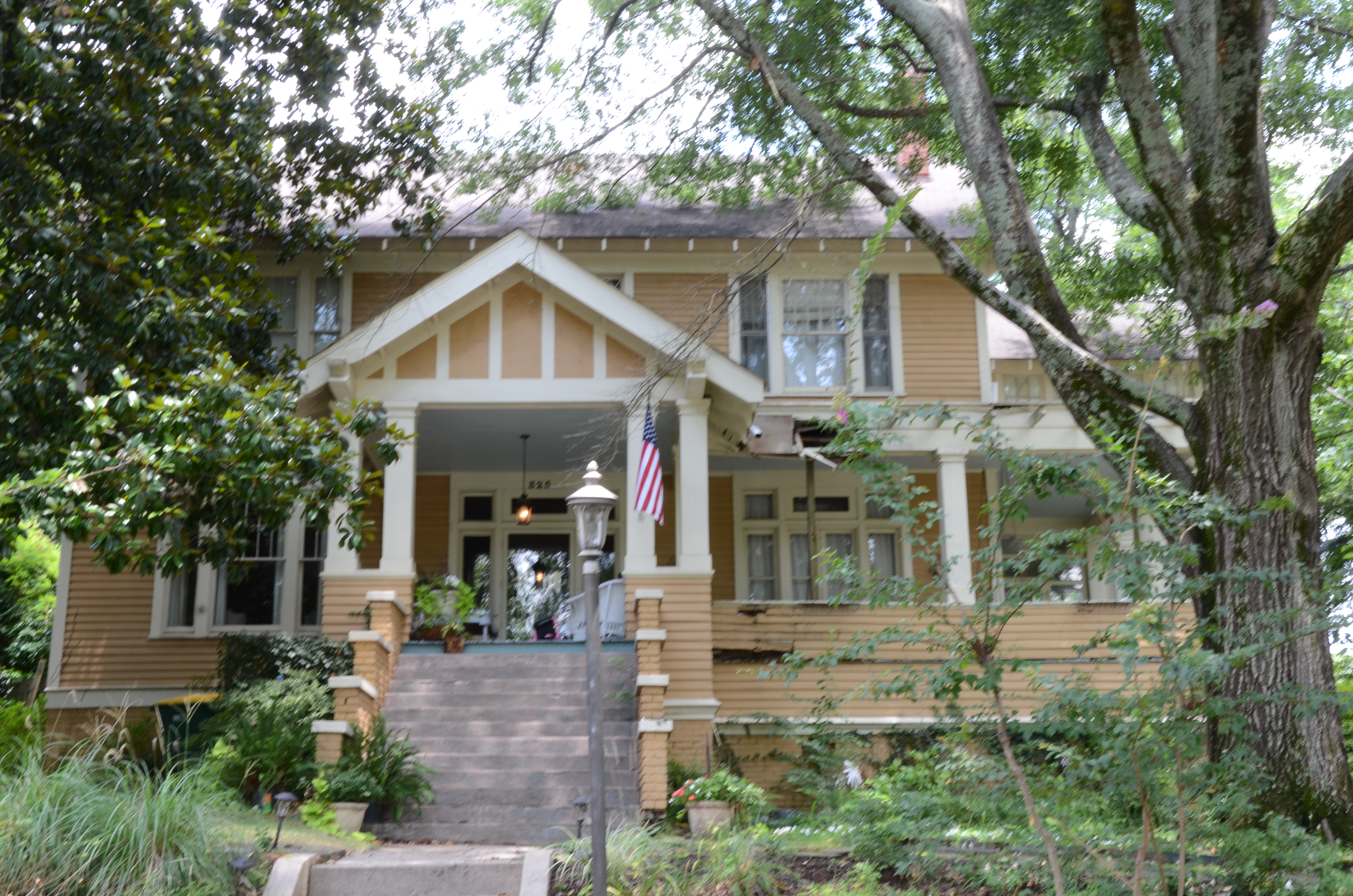

- Location within Arkansas Location within the United States
- Location: 325 Fairfax St., Little Rock, Arkansas
- Coordinates: 34°45′11″N 92°18′28″W
- Built: 1911
- Architect: Theodore Sanders
- Architectural style: Bungalow/Craftsman
- Part of: Hillcrest Historic District (ID90001920)
- MPS: Thompson, Charles L., Design Collection TR
- NRHP reference No.: 84000238

Significant dates
- Added to NRHP: November 15, 1984
- Designated CP: December 18, 1990

The Williamson House is a historic house at 325 Fairfax Street in Little Rock, Arkansas, USA. It is a two-story wood-frame structure, with a gabled roof, clapboarded exterior, and brick foundation. Its roof has exposed rafter ends in the Craftsman style, and a wraparound porch supported by simple square columns. The projecting entry porch has a gable with decorative false half-timbering, and is supported by grouped columns. The house was designed by Little Rock architect Theodore Sanders and was built about 1911. Photos of the house were used in promotional materials for the subdivision in which it is located.

The house was listed on the National Register of Historic Places in 1984.

== See also ==
- National Register of Historic Places listings in Little Rock, Arkansas
