= Lamar Porter Athletic Field =

- U.S. National Register of Historic Places
- U.S. Historic district – Contributing property
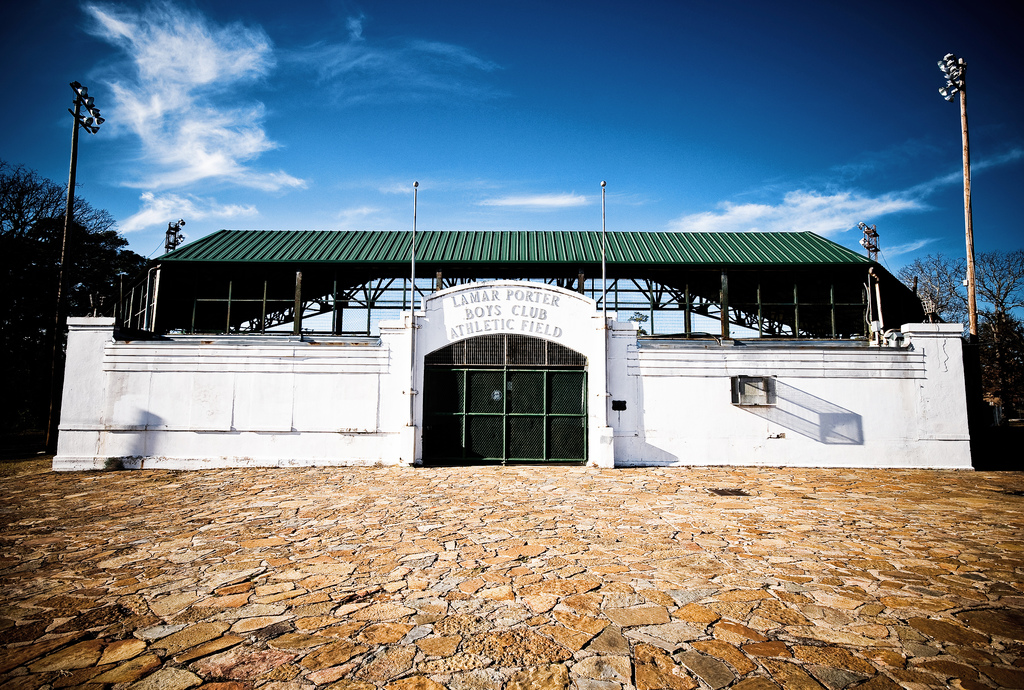
- The entrance to Lamar Porter Field

- Location within Arkansas Location within the United States
- Location: Jct. of Johnson and 7th Sts., Little Rock, Arkansas
- Coordinates: 34°44′45.76″N 92°18′29.21″W
- Built: 1934–1936
- Architect: Works Progress Administration
- Part of: Stifft Station Historic District (ID06000941)
- NRHP reference No.: 90001827

Significant dates
- Added to NRHP: December 6, 1990
- Designated CP: October 18, 2006

Lamar Porter Athletic Field is located at West 7th and Johnson Streets, in the Stifft Station neighborhood of Little Rock, Arkansas, United States. It is a Works Progress Administration-built baseball field placed on the National Register of Historic Places on December 6, 1990. Hall of Fame third baseman Brooks Robinson started his career at Porter Field.

As described in its National Register nomination form, the construction of the ball field was "one of the bell weather events of the early years of the Little Rock Boys' Club." When it was built, the 10-acre (40,000 m^{2}) site was in what was then regarded as "west" Little Rock in an area identified as desirable for park and playing field development by John Nolen, a nationally renowned city planner and landscape architect who was dismayed by the lack of recreational facilities in Little Rock.

Nolen observed that although school grounds offered the "opportunity for the sand boxes and apparatus used by small children, there remained a demonstrable need for two classes of playgrounds where boys between ten and sixteen and from sixteen upwards can have the opportunity for […] more seriously organized games."

Construction of just such a field began in the fall of 1934 and employed workmen with the federal Works Progress Administration. The project took 18 months to complete. Tennis courts, playgrounds, and other recreational spaces complement the ball field.

Lamar Porter was the son of Mr. And Mrs. Q. L. Porter of Little Rock, born August 17, 1913. He was educated in Little Rock's public schools, attended Little Rock High School, and graduated from Sewanee Military Academy in Tennessee in 1931. Porter was a junior at Washington and Lee University in Virginia when he was killed May 12, 1934, in an automobile accident between Lexington and Staunton, Virginia.

It was the family of Lamar Porter, in attempt to memorialize his life, who provided the land and money required to build the eponymous baseball field. His mother; aunt, Mrs. J.D. Jordan; and his brother, Jim S. Porter made the donation on the first anniversary of Porter's death, which coincidentally fell on Mother's Day.

When the complex was complete, it held a lighted softball diamond with underground wiring, four lighted tennis courts, a regulation baseball diamond, a 1,500-seat grandstand complete with club rooms, shower and locker rooms, rest rooms, and a concession stand. It was first used by Boys' Club teams in the summer of 1936; by 1937, it was also being used by city leagues and American Legion teams.

The property also held an apparatus area with swings, slides, and jungle gyms; a small children's play area that included hammocks, small slides, and kindergarten tables; a play area for older children with facilities for handcrafts and quiet games; and other areas for shuffleboard, marbles, horseshoes, handball, volleyball, and table tennis, as well as picnic areas and a "stage for dramatics."

Lamar Porter Athletic Field opened to the public in 1937 at the corner of Seventh and Johnson streets where it eventually became home to Pewee League, Midget League, Little League, Pony League, American Legion, and semi-pro baseball teams. The Little Rock Doughboys were the only Legion team in town until they were replaced by an eight-team Legion league in 1954.

The baseball sequence from the 1984 film A Soldier's Story was filmed at the historic field.

== See also ==
- National Register of Historic Places listings in Little Rock, Arkansas
