= Beck's American Translation =

An American Translation
- Full name: The Holy Bible, An American Translation
- Abbreviation: BECK
- Language: English
- Complete Bible published: 1976
- Authorship: William F. Beck
- Publisher: Leader Publishing Company: New Haven, MO
- Genesis 1:1–3 In the beginning God created heaven and earth. There was nothing living on the empty earth, and it was dark on the deep sea, but God's Spirit hovered over the waters. Then God said, "Let there be light!" And there was light. John 3:16 God so loved the world that He gave His only Son so that everyone who believes in Him doesn't perish but has everlasting life.

Beck's American Translation is an abbreviated version of "The Holy Bible: An American Translation" by William F. Beck (abbreviated BECK, but also AAT; not to be confused with Smith/Goodspeed's earlier "An American Translation", which is abbreviated AAT or SGAT). The Lutheran Church–Missouri Synod's Concordia Publishing House published his "An American Translation--The New Testament In The Language Of Today" in 1963.

The preface to the 1976 Bicentennial edition, written by Herman Otten, states:

Dr. Beck wrote on a hospital bed while under oxygen shortly before his death on October 24, 1966 in a statement titled "My Old Testament": "Promotion of my translation will run up against special difficulties with my exact translation of the prophecies and every doctrinal passage. Modernist powers use all their tricks and tyranny to oppose a Christ-centered Bible." ... The 1967 convention of this church in a resolution titled "To Encourage Publication of Dr. Beck's Translation of Old Testament" resolved "That we encourage Concordia Publishing House to continue its negotiations to make Dr. William Beck's translation available to the public as soon as possible."

Beck wanted his translation to become the official translation of the Lutheran Church–Missouri Synod, but the synod has no official English translation.

== See also ==
- List of English Bible translations
