= Pulaski Heights =

Neighborhood of Little Rock, Arkansas

Coordinates: 34°45′26″N 92°19′01″W

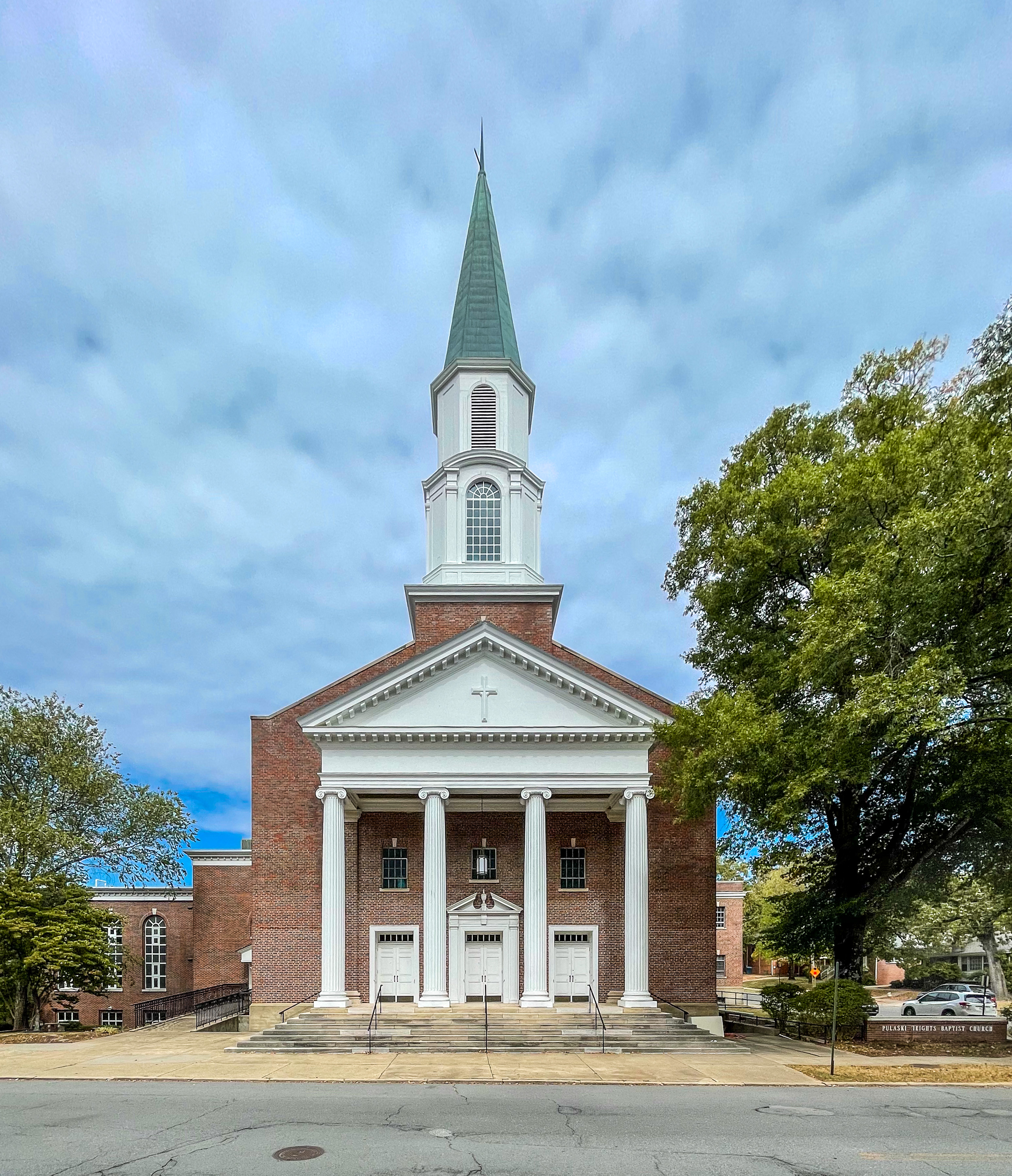
Pulaski Heights Baptist Church on Kavanaugh Boulevard

Pulaski Heights is a section of the city of Little Rock, Arkansas, located in the north-central portion of the city. Locally, the area is referred to as the Heights.

== History ==
The Pulaski Heights neighborhood was historically an affluent area of Little Rock and incorporated on August 1, 1905. The heavily wooded area grew from a few dozen families in the 1890s, to more than 300 once electricity and streetcars began to reach the area. A weekly newspaper, the Pulaskian, was written and published in the neighborhood.

The area remained an independent community until 1916, when the residents voted to become Little Rock's Ninth Ward for the advantages of becoming an incorporated neighborhood, including a fire station. Eventually, the Pulaski Heights neighborhood broke into two smaller neighborhoods: the Heights and Hillcrest.

On March 31, 1960, a B-47 bomber exploded over the neighborhood, with the nose cone being found in Allsopp Park. The craft took off from the nearby Little Rock Air Force Base with an intended destination of Barksdale Air Force Base in Shreveport, Louisiana. Three of the four crew members did not survive. Two civilians were also killed in the incident.

=== Education ===
Mount St. Mary's Academy and Convent, founded in 1851 in downtown Little Rock, moved to a 10-acre site on Kavanaugh Blvd in 1908. In doing so, they stopped instruction for boys and dropped "convent" from their name. Mount St. Mary's Academy is the oldest educational institution in continuous operation in the state of Arkansas. It would be 1930 before the Little Rock Catholic High School was built nearby to serve the areas male Catholic students.

Pulaski Heights Middle School was founded for the area residents in 1908, at the corner of Prospect and Oak Streets. Today, those streets are named Lee Avenue and Pine Street.

Little Rock College, founded in 1908, moved to North Tyler Street in the Heights in 1916; however, the school would close due to the Great Depression with an announcement on July 12, 1930.

=== Recreation ===
The area boasts several parks including Knoop and Allsopp parks. Allsopp is a 150-acre park that was donated from the private lands of Frederick W. Allsopp, and Knoop Park has been the home to the Little Rock Water Works since 1886. The Country Club of Little Rock, built in 1902, is the oldest country club west of the Mississippi and is known for its exclusive and elite membership. There is an 18-hole golf course, dining room, and family center.

=== Architecture ===
Several notable architects were commissioned to build homes and businesses in the area including Charles L. Thompson and George R. Mann, who also designed the Arkansas State Capitol. Most homes are of Georgian, Tudor, Craftsman, and English Revival style. Unfortunately, there was a time the neighborhood was "white only" and disallowed people of color to buy or rent homes within the area. This was outlawed in 1948, when the U.S. Supreme Court ruled racial covenants unconstitutional with the decision of Shelley v. Kraemer.

== Notable residents ==
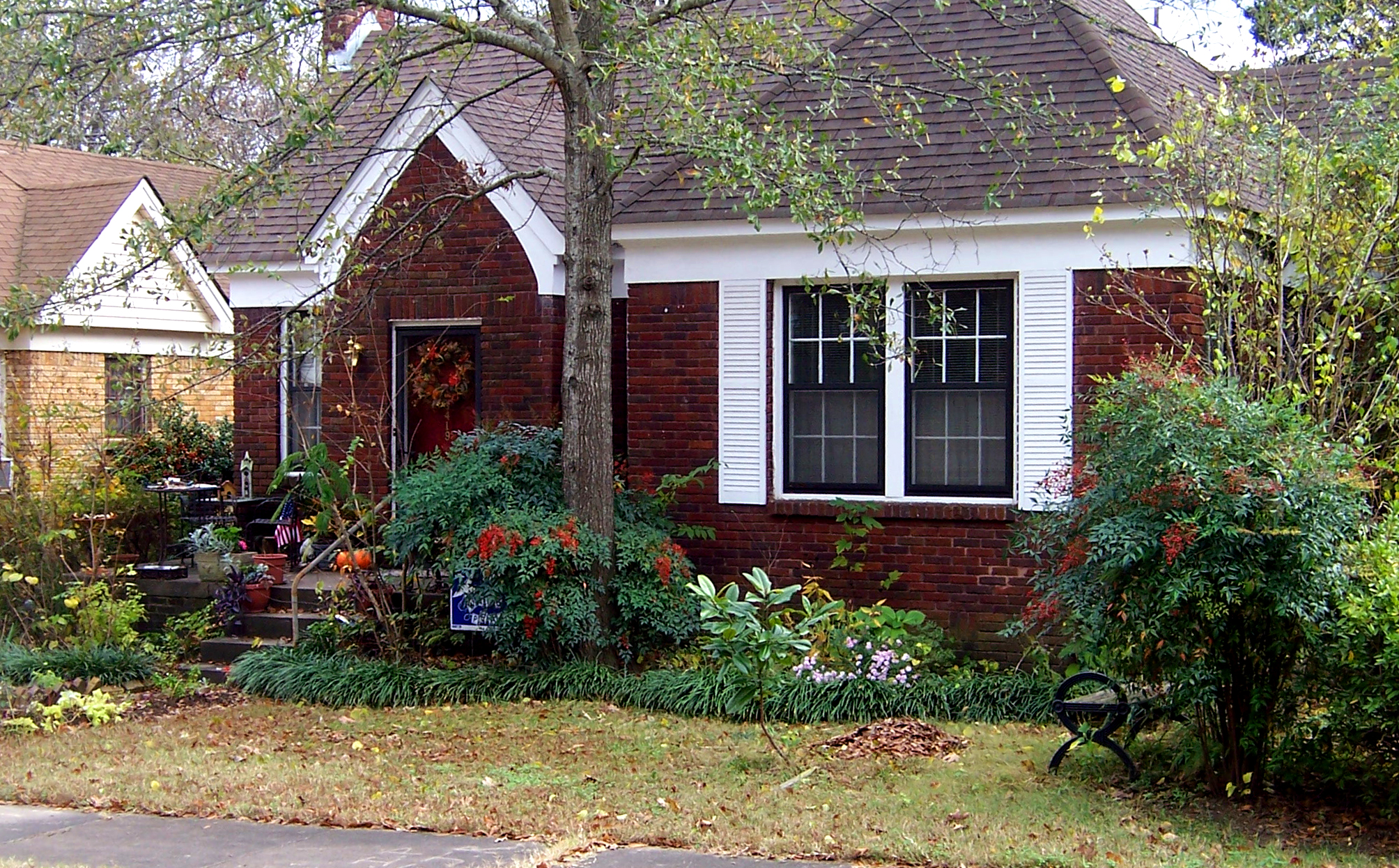
Hillary Rodham and Bill Clinton lived in this 980 square foot (91 m^{2}) house in the Hillcrest from 1977 to 1979 while he was Arkansas Attorney General.

Former Governor of Arkansas and President of the United States, Bill Clinton, and his wife, Hillary Rodham Clinton, lived in the neighborhood during the formers tenure as Arkansas Attorney General. The most famous resident to grow up in the neighborhood, however, was Helen Gurley Brown, the founder of Cosmopolitan magazine and author of "Sex and the Single Girl." The Brown family moved to a home on Monroe Street in 1932 when Mr. Brown was running for political office. He died in an elevator accident in the state capitol in 1932, and the remaining family moved to Los Angeles, California in 1937. Frederick W. Allsopp, who is most known today for donating the land where Allsopp Park now sits, was also a resident of the area.

== Today ==
It is marked by boutiques and restaurants along Kavanaugh Boulevard, St. John's Seminary, and the Country Club of Little Rock. With an estimated population of 30,000 people, the Ninth Ward is now known as Ward 3, and represented by Kathy Webb as of 2024.
