= Retan House =

Historic house in Arkansas, United States

- U.S. National Register of Historic Places
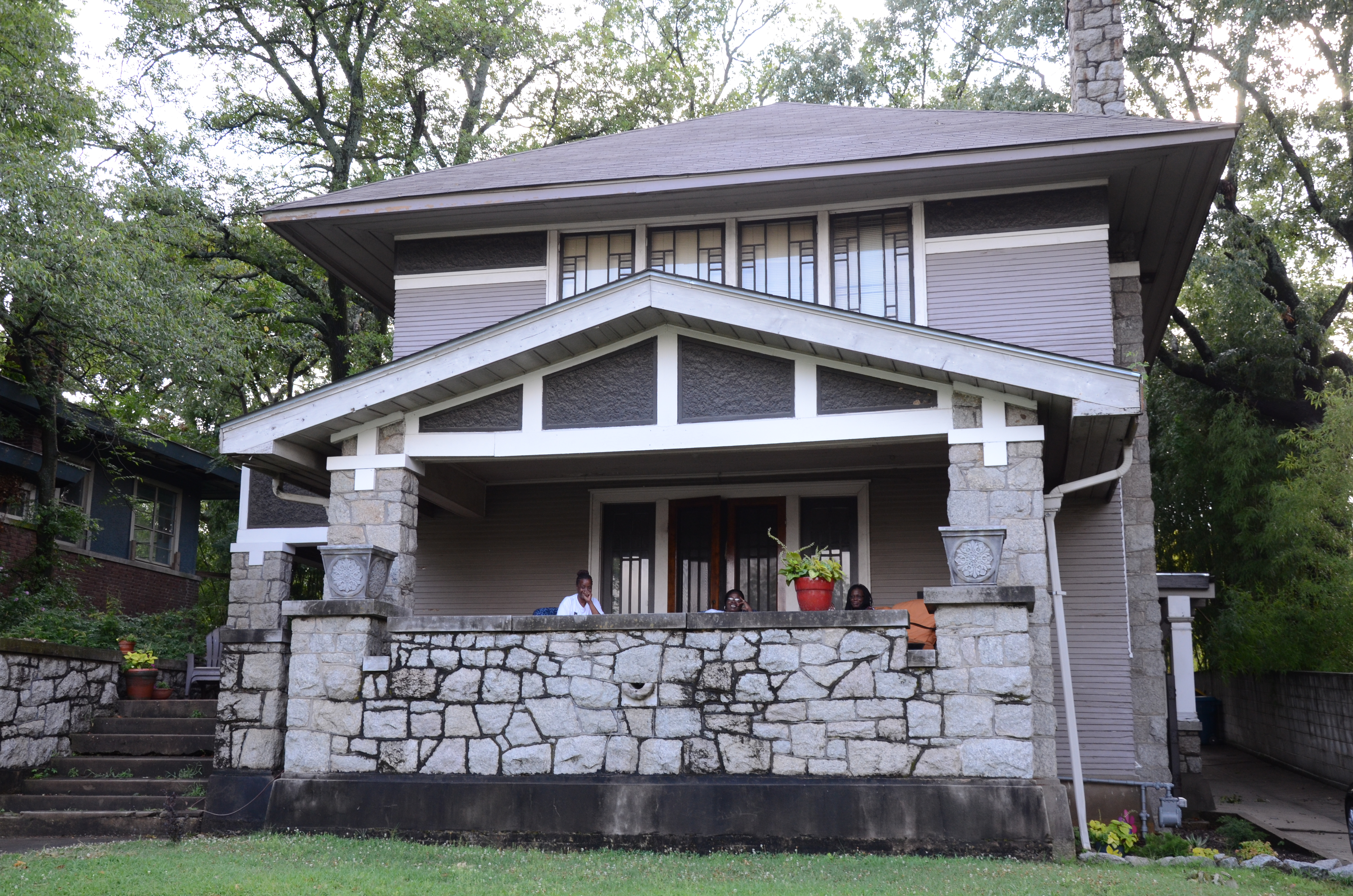

- Location within Arkansas Location within the United States
- Location: 2510 S. Broadway, Little Rock, Arkansas
- Coordinates: 34°43′26″N 92°16′44″W
- Area: less than one acre
- Built: 1915
- Architect: Charles L. Thompson
- Architectural style: Prairie School
- MPS: Thompson, Charles L., Design Collection TR
- NRHP reference No.: 82000921
- Added to NRHP: December 22, 1982

The Retan House is a historic house at 2510 South Broadway in Little Rock, Arkansas. It is a modest two-story frame structure, with shallow-pitch hip roof with broad eaves. A single-story porch extends across the front, with a broad gable roof supported by stone piers. The entrance is on the left side, and there is a three-part window at the center of the front under the porch. Above the porch are a band of four multi-pane windows in the Prairie School style. The house was built in 1915 to a design by Charles L. Thompson, and is one of his finer examples of the Prairie School style.

The house was listed on the National Register of Historic Places in 1982.

== See also ==
- National Register of Historic Places listings in Little Rock, Arkansas
