= Hillcrest (Little Rock) =

- Hillcrest Historic District
- U.S. National Register of Historic Places
- U.S. Historic district
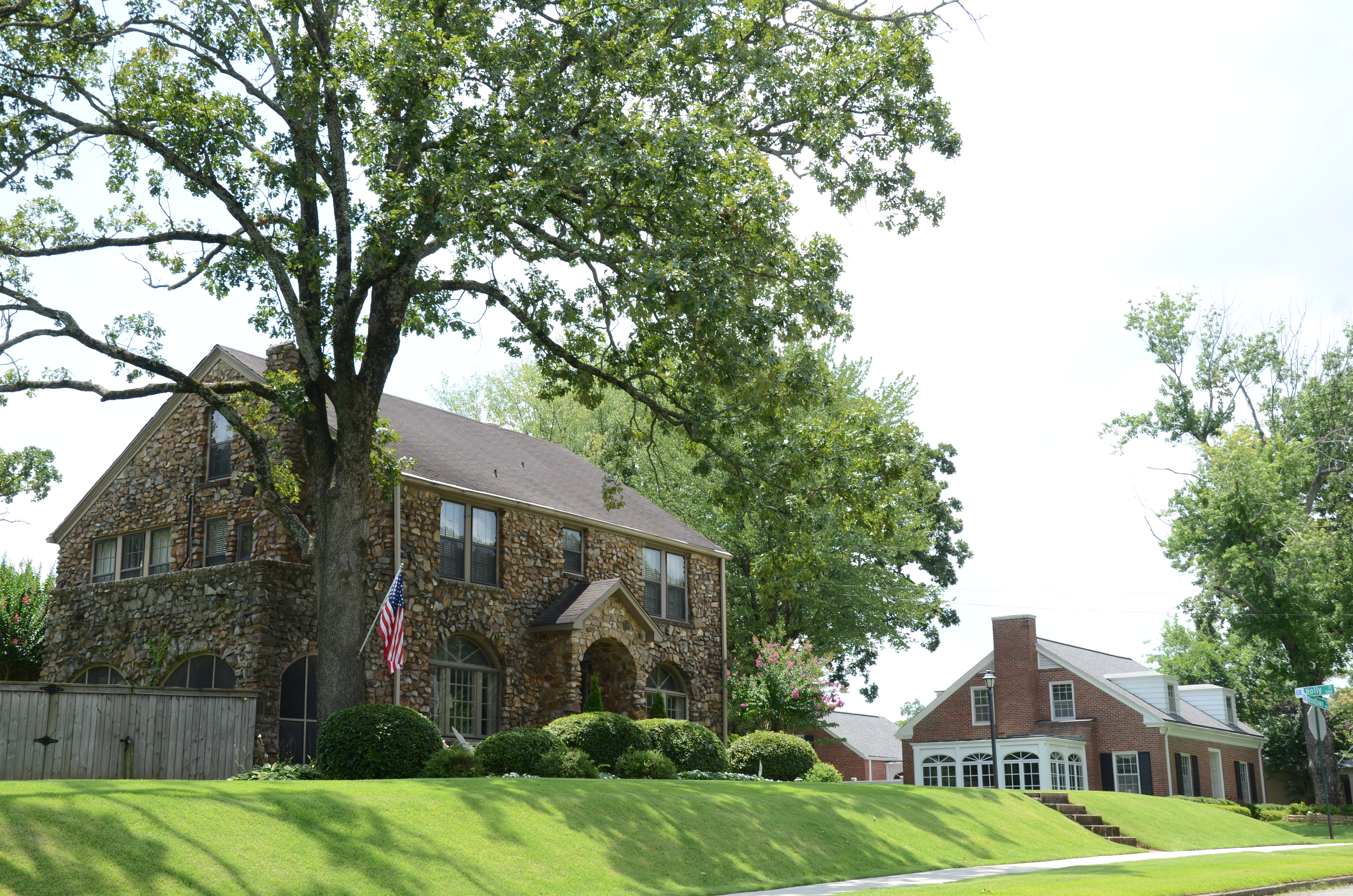

- Location within Arkansas Location within the United States
- Location: Bounded by Woodrow, Jackson and Markham Streets and North Lookout Road. (original); Roughly bounded by Evergreen, Harrison, Lee and Jackson Sts. (increase), Little Rock, Arkansas
- Coordinates: 34°45′29″N 92°19′28″W
- Area: 665 acres (269 ha) (original); 42 acres (17 ha) (size of increase)
- Architect: Charles L. Thompson, K.E.N. Cole (original)
- Architectural style: Classical Revival, Bungalow/Craftsman, Tudor Revival (original); Late 19th And 20th Century Revivals, Bungalow/Craftsman, Late Victorian (increase)
- NRHP reference No.: 90001920 (original); 92001356 (increase)

Significant dates
- Added to NRHP: December 18, 1990
- Boundary increase: October 8, 1992

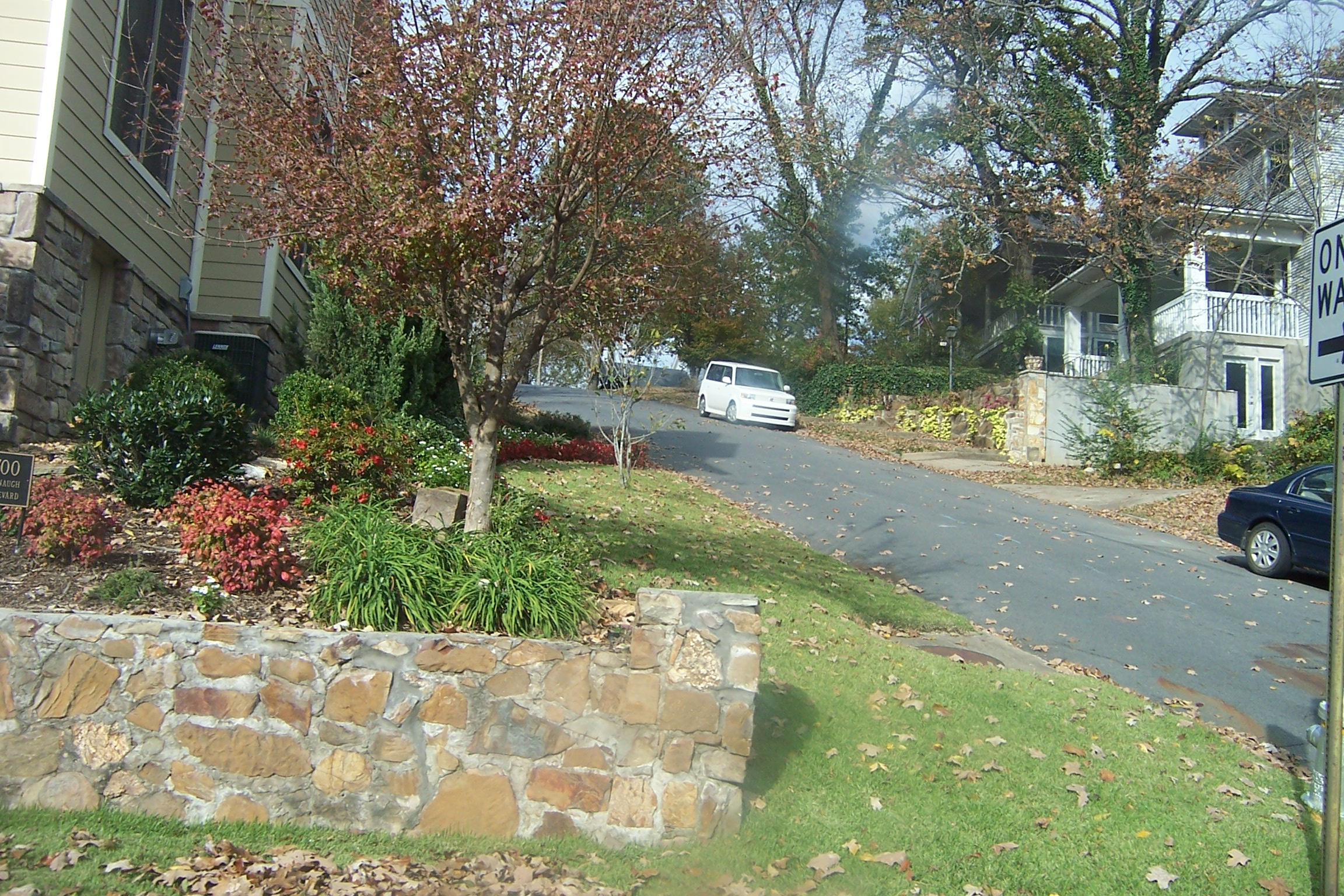
A typically steep residential side street in the Hillcrest Historic District: Midland Street

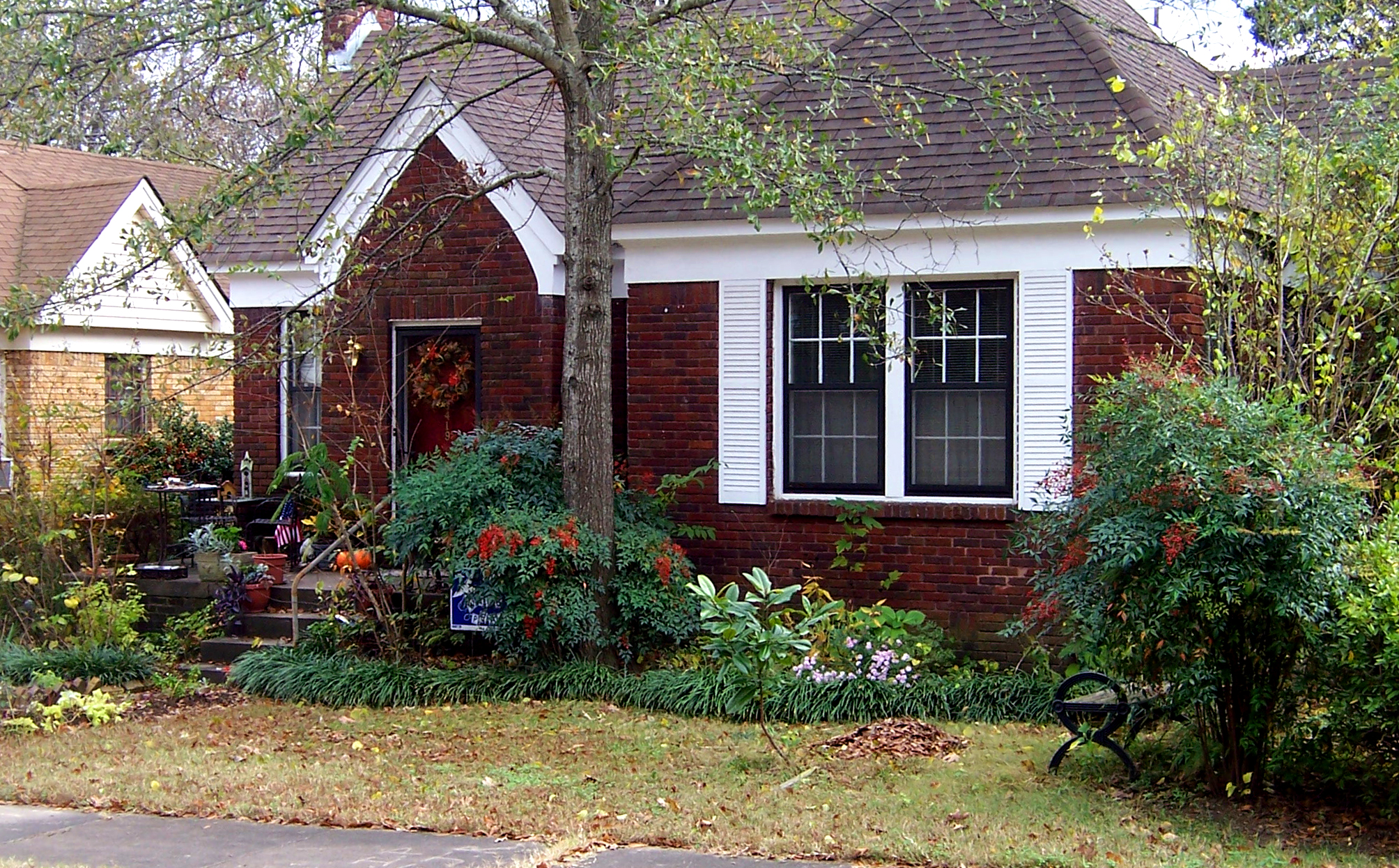
Hillary Rodham and Bill Clinton lived in this 980 square foot (91 m^{2}) house in the Hillcrest neighborhood of Little Rock from 1977 to 1979 while he was Arkansas Attorney General.

Hillcrest Historic District is a historic neighborhood in Little Rock, Arkansas that was listed on the National Register of Historic Places on December 18, 1990. It is often referred to as Hillcrest by the people who live there, although the district's boundaries actually encompass several neighborhood additions that were once part of the incorporated town of Pulaski Heights. The town of Pulaski Heights was annexed to the city of Little Rock in 1916. The Hillcrest Residents Association uses the tagline "Heart of Little Rock" because the area is located almost directly in the center of the city and was the first street car suburb in Little Rock and among the first of neighborhoods in Arkansas.

== History ==
The Hillcrest Historic District includes several neighborhood additions platted between 1890 and 1920, including Hillcrest, Pulaski Heights, Auten & Moss, The Hollenberg, Midland Hills, Elmhurst, Lincoln Park, and several others. The area was once part of the town of Pulaski Heights. In the 19th Century, this hilly area outside of the Little Rock city limits was simply referred to by city locals and developers as The Highlands or The Heights and extended west of Little Rock three to four miles. Investors in the City Electric Street Railway Company acquired much of the land in 1888 before any residential or commercial development began. The street car company was second in a line of street car companies in Little Rock but the first to run on electricity, steam, or coal. The plan to extend electric and steam powered street car service to the area in the 1880s was a means to promote the area's development and increase ridership of the street car.

In the early days, there were only two ways to get to the highlands and neither were easy. A shorter and more direct route required a bridge over a deep ravine where the St. Louis & Choctaw Railroad tracks ran at West 3rd Street. The street car company contracted with the railroad to build a steel bridge, but it was delayed by the Panic of 1893. Several railroads had already gone bankrupt and steel was expensive. Michigan real estate developers moved to Little Rock on advice from lumbermen harvesting timber and bought out the street car company and lumbermen's interest. These investors established a land company and built homes for themselves, but it took a few more years for a wooden bridge to be built over the ravine. The street car line was finally extended to the area in 1902 by a subsequent railway company. The street car traveled from downtown Little Rock to near the current intersection of Markham Street and Kavanaugh Boulevard called Stifft's Station. From there, it followed the hill along Kavanaugh, then named Prospect Avenue, to where North Martin intersects today. Another stop was at the current intersection of Kavanaugh and Woodlawn and the fourth at Beechwood. The street car continued around the horseshoe bend to the Country Club with several stops in between. With more convenient transportation, building of residences for wealthier, prominent citizens of Little Rock began in earnest, and the area grew to include many diverse architectural styles and structures built over several decades until the mid-century. Only a few houses that were built in the 19th century are standing today, and belonged to the original investors who came to Little Rock from Michigan. Most of the homes in Hillcrest Historic District today were built in the early part of the 20th century and are of the Arts & Crafts or Bungalow styles.

The Hillcrest Historic District includes the first story of the former town hall building on the southeast corner of Kavanaugh and Beechwood; the second floor burned in the 1970s and was never rebuilt. One of the oldest educational institutions in Arkansas—Mount St. Mary Academy—a girls' Catholic school is located in the district and has been in operation for over 100 years. Hillcrest Historic District contains some of Little Rock's most historic construction in both commercial and residential areas, and the district design overlay helps ensure the integrity of these architectural features.

Additionally, the Hillcrest Historic District includes Allsopp Park, a major city park situated on the slopes of two ravines north and south of the old Hillcrest neighborhood which runs along a ridge on the district's northern section. Hillcrest Historic District tends to be more politically liberal than other areas of the city, including the nearby Heights area. In 2006, Hillcrest voters formed the core of a majority in Arkansas's House District 37, electing Arkansas's first openly gay member of the state's House of Representatives.

== Hillcrest Historic District Design Overlay ==
When originally listed on the National Register of Historic Places in 1990, it covered an area that was bounded by Woodrow, Jackson, and Markham Streets and North Lookout Rd. In 1992 the boundaries were increased to include an additional area roughly bounded by Jackson Street, Harrison Street, Lee Avenue, and Evergreen Street. The historic district is distinctive within the city for its well-preserved cross-section of architectural styles popular before World War II.

== Architectural styles ==
Many of what make Hillcrest an historic district and famous neighborhood are the sought-after houses of diverse architectural styles. Ranging from Prairie to Queen Anne style, the houses were built from all different time periods to represent Hillcrest as a different type of suburb. The different types of houses contained in the historic district include:

- Queen Anne
- Colonial Revival
- Pyramid Cottages
- Prairie
- "Foursquare"
- Craftsman
- Craftsman Bungalow
- "Period Houses" - English Revival
- Modernistic Houses
- Commercial

Most residences were developed between about 1890 and 1940. The district includes a number of individually-listed properties, including:

- Retan House, at 2510 Broadway
- Werner Knoop House, at 6 Ozark Point
- Reid House, at 1425 Kavanaugh St.
- Williamson House, at 325 Fairfax St.
- Boone House, at 4014 Lookout.

Architect Theo Sanders designed several houses in the neighborhood.

== See also ==
- National Register of Historic Places listings in Little Rock, Arkansas
