= Woodlands Edge =

Neighborhood in Little Rock, Arkansas, United States

Coordinates: 34°44′05″N 92°25′33″W

Woodlands Edge is a residential neighborhood in Little Rock, Arkansas, developed by Rocket Properties, LLC. The project began with a 54-acre tract purchase in July 2001 and grew to nearly 800 acres.

Sustainable site design principles and low impact design techniques were used during development to maintain the existing vegetation. Nearly 40% of the land in this neighborhood is preserved for trees and wildlife.

Lots in this neighborhood range from $45,000 to $160,000. Homes have a variety of architectural standards, such as minimum building size and regulations defined by the neighborhood association.

== Awards ==
Woodlands Edge has received the following awards for sustainability and ongoing green initiatives.

- 2009 Green Development of the Year – the National Association of Home Builders (NAHB)
- 2008 Developer Award – American Trails
- 2007 American Society of Landscape Architects Honor Award
- 2005 & 2007 Little Rock City Beautiful Award
- 2005 Building With Trees Award – the National Arbor Day Foundation
- 2002 Outstanding Developer – Arkansas Urban Forestry Council
