= Timeline of Little Rock, Arkansas =

The following is a timeline of the history of the city of Little Rock, Arkansas, US.

== 18th–19th centuries ==
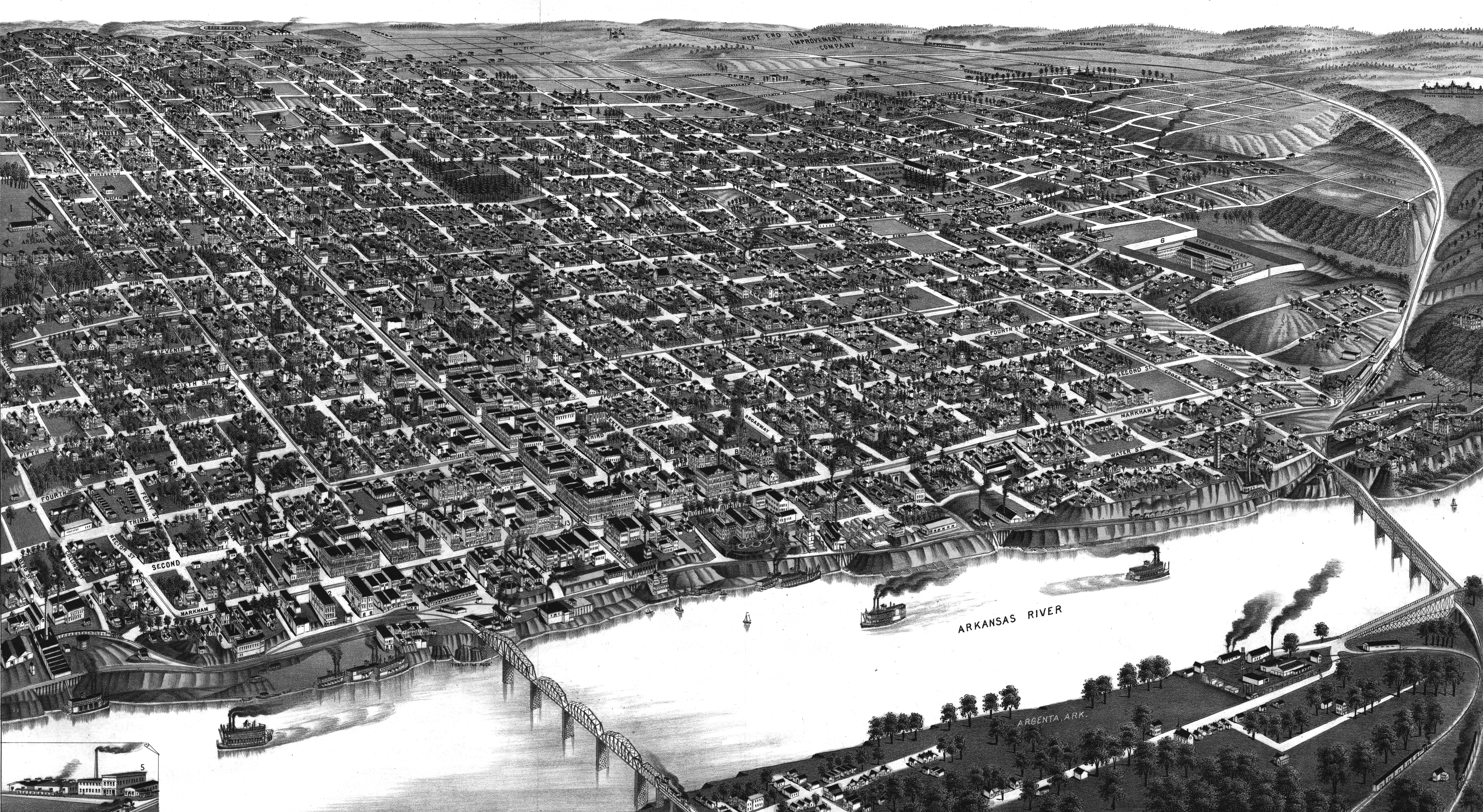
Little Rock, Arkansas, 1887

- 1722 – French explorer Jean-Baptiste Benard de la Harpe lands near a small rock formation on the south bank of the Arkansas River, which he reputedly names la Petite Roche (the little rock). La Harpe builds a trading post near the little rock. The Quapaw Indians reside nearby.
- 1812 – William Lewis, a fur trapper, builds a temporary seasonal home near the little rock.
- 1814 – Colonel Edmund Hogan builds first home and ferry at the Little Rock where the road from Missouri crossed the Arkansas River
- 1815 – Colonel Edmund Hogan is the signer of the Grand Jury of Arkansas County, Missouri Territory, requesting a company of regular troops be stationed in said county in April 1816
- 1816–1818 – Colonel Edmund Hogan represents Arkansas County in the 3rd Territorial General Assembly of Missouri in 1816 and 1818
- 1818 – Colonel Edmund Hogan is appointed the first justice of the peace of Pulaski County
- 1819 – The Arkansas Gazette is established.
- 1820
  - January 1820 – Colonel Edmund Hogan sells his ferry and settlement on the Arkansas River at Little Rock to William Russell. The ferry was later owned by first territorial secretary Robert Crittenden.
  - Little Rock is surveyed.
  - Robert Crittenden, born 1797, and Chester Ashley, born 1791, enter into an agreement for a "Partnership in the Practice of Law" which lays the groundwork for the Rose Law Firm, the oldest law firm west of the Mississippi River.
- 1821
  - March 21, 1821 – Colonel Edmund Hogan is appointed as Brigadier General of the Arkansas Militia by President James Monroe.
  - Matthew Cunningham arrives in Little Rock. He is the first physician in the city.
  - Little Rock becomes the capital of the Arkansas Territory formed in 1819; and seat of Pulaski County.
  - Arkansas Gazette in publication.
  - Little Rock briefly renamed "Arkopolis."
- 1825 – Little Rock Tavern in business (approximate date).
- 1826 – Robert Cunningham, son of Matthew and Eliza, is the first free child born in Little Rock. Records do not survive for births of enslaved persons leaving unclear whether Cunningham was the first child born in the city.
- 1830 – Advocate (Whig) newspaper begins publication.
- 1831 – Little Rock is incorporated as a city.
  - Dr. Matthew Cunningham is elected the first mayor of Little Rock. His descendants reside in the city as of 2022.
- 1833 – Arkansas State House (now Old State House Museum) is built. Completed in 1842, it serves as the State capitol until 1911.
- 1836
  - Jesse Brown becomes mayor.
  - Arkansas becomes the 25th State, and Little Rock became the official capital city.
  - Pulaski County Lyceum active (approximate date).
- 1837 – Antiquarian and Natural History Society and Bar Association founded.
- 1838 – Steam ferry begins operating.
- 1839 – Little Rock Theatre opens.
- 1840 – The Tornado newspaper begins publication.
- 1841 – Little Rock Arsenal (now MacArthur Museum of Military History) is completed. It serves as a storehouse for U.S. ordnance.
- 1843
  - Mount Holly Cemetery established.
  - William Woodruff's Circulating Library in business.
- 1845 – Catholic church built.
- 1850 – Population: 2,167.
- 1858 – Mechanics' Institute established.
- 1859 – St. Johns military college opens.
- 1860 – Population: 3,727.
- 1861
  - U.S. Captain James Totten surrenders Little Rock Arsenal to Governor Henry M. Rector.
  - Arkansas joins the Confederacy.
- 1863
  - Union forces occupy Little Rock.
  - Daily Pantograph newspaper begins publication.
- 1864 – 17-year-old David O. Dodd is hanged on January 6 for being a Confederate spy.
- 1866 – Little Rock Police Department formed.
- 1867 – Mercantile Library is founded.
- 1868
  - Arkansas constitutional convention held.
  - Little Rock National Cemetery established.
- 1870 – Population: 12,000 (approximate).
- 1873
  - Baring Cross Bridge constructed.
  - Arkansas Press Association headquartered in Little Rock.
- 1874
  - The Brooks-Baxter War takes place in Little Rock.
  - Union Station is built.
- 1876
  - Horsecar trams begins operating.
  - Anthony House (hotel) burns down.
- 1877 – Walden Seminary founded.
- 1879 – Telephone begins operating per Western Union Telegraph Company.
- 1880 – General Douglas MacArthur born on January 26 in The Tower Building of the Little Rock Arsenal. The building is now the home of the MacArthur Museum of Arkansas Military History, and the surrounding area is called MacArthur Park.
- 1881 – Little Rock United States Post Office and Courthouse built.
- 1882 – Cathedral of St. Andrew built.
- 1883
  - Mosaic Templars of America founded.
  - Little Rock Electric Light Company begins operating.
- 1884
  - Waterworks system and Trinity Episcopal Cathedral built.
  - Minister's Institute founded.
- 1885 – Walnut Grove Methodist Church built.
- 1887 – Little Rock Electric Street Railway Company chartered.
- 1888 – Electric street lighting installed.
- 1890
  - Argenta becomes part of city (until 1917).
  - Population: 25,874.
- 1891 – Electric streetcars begin operating.
- 1892 – Fire Department established.
- 1897 – Arkansas Federation of Women's Clubs organized during a meeting in Little Rock.
- 1900 – Population: 38,307.

== 20th century ==
=== 1900s-1940s ===
- 1908
  - Gazette Building constructed.
  - Little Rock College opened.
- 1910
  - Public library and Royal Theater open.
  - Population: 45,941.
- 1911 – The current State Capitol building is completed. It is the second building constructed to house the state government, after the Old State House.
- 1915
  - Little Rock Motor Club active (approximate date).
  - Arkansas State Capitol built.
  - The Pulaskian is first published.
- 1916 – Pulaski Heights, one of Little Rock's earliest western suburbs, is annexed by the city, enabling westward expansion.
- 1917
  - Little Rock Public Library negro branch opens.
  - Little Rock Daily News begins publication.

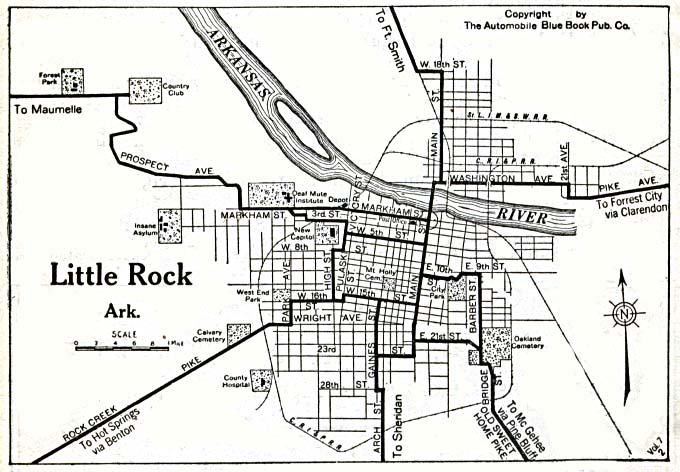
Little Rock in 1920

- 1921 – Mopac Station rebuilt.
- 1924 – Albert Pike Memorial Temple, and Federal Reserve Bank built.
- 1926
  - KLRA radio begins broadcasting.
  - Little Rock Zoo founded.
  - Donaghey Building constructed.
- 1927
  - Little Rock race riot, May 4, murder suspect John Carter was lynched and his body burned; a white mob of 5,000 rioted in the black business section, destroying many buildings
  - Little Rock Junior College and The Arkansas Museum of Natural History and Antiquities established.
  - Little Rock Senior High School built.
  - KGHI radio begins broadcasting.
- 1929
  - Dunbar Junior and Senior High School and Junior College established.
  - Albert Pike Residence Hotel opens.
- 1930
  - KARK radio begins broadcasting.
  - Little Rock College closed.
- 1932 – Travelers Field (ballpark) opens.
- 1937
  - Urban League and the Museum of Fine Arts founded.
  - Arkansas Library Commission headquartered in Little Rock.
- 1940 – Population: 88,039.
- 1941 – Historic Arkansas Museum opens.
- 1947 – City Beautification Forum organized.
- 1948 – War Memorial Stadium (Arkansas) opens.

=== 1950s-1990s ===
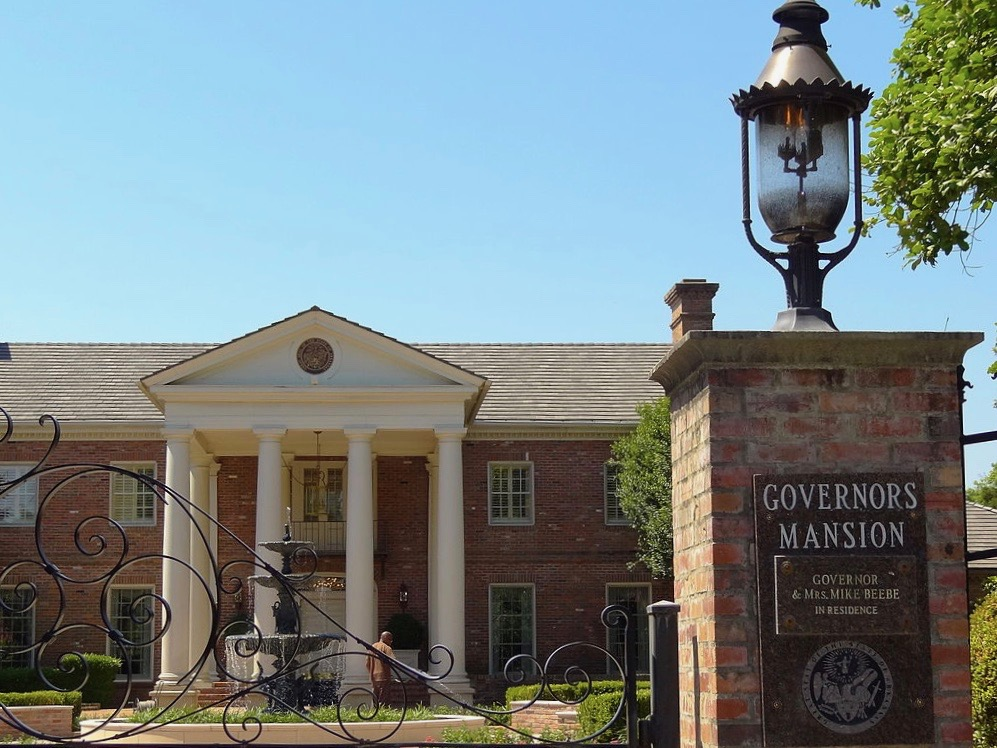
The Arkansas Governor's Mansion was opened in 1950.

- 1950
  - Arkansas Governor's Mansion built.
  - Little Rock goes over 100,000 in population within the city and the metropolitan area has 196,000 people.
- 1951
  - Pratt C. Remmel becomes mayor; first Republican mayor since 1887
  - Pulaski County Historical Society established.
- 1953
  - KATV (television) begins broadcasting.
  - Pulaski County Historical Review begins publication.
- 1954 – KARK-TV (television) begins broadcasting.
- 1955
  - KTHV (television) begins broadcasting.
  - Little Rock Air Force Base activated near city.
- 1956 – Community Theatre of Little Rock founded.
- 1957 – The Little Rock Nine are enrolled at Little Rock Central High School after public protests, and the Arkansas National Guard under the direction of Governor Orval Faubus, prevents their first attempt at enrollment. Arkansas was the third most segregated state in the country at the time (behind Mississippi and Alabama respectively). President Dwight Eisenhower dispatches federal troops to ensure the students' safety and enforce their right to attend school. These events are collectively referred to as the Crisis at Central High.
- 1958 – All three public high schools in Little Rock are closed for one year by Governor Faubus in an attempt to subvert federal efforts to desegregate Arkansas public schools.
- 1960 – Arkansas Arts Center founded.
- 1964 – Dillard's headquartered in Little Rock.
- 1967 – University Mall opens.
- 1968 – Construction booms downtown, Worthen Bank Building at 375 feet (114 m) and Union National Bank at 330 feet (100 m) are under construction and replace The Tower Building as the city's tallest buildings. Union National Bank subsequently merged into Worthen, which eventually would become part of Bank of America.
- 1971
  - Children's Theater founded.
  - Heifer International headquartered in city.
- 1974 – First National Bank building is under construction and becomes the city's tallest building at 454 feet (138 m) and 30 stories. The building currently is Arkansas headquarters for Regions Bank.
- 1975 – Central Arkansas Library System headquartered in city.
- 1976 – Arkansas Repertory Theatre founded.
- 1979
  - Webster Hubbell becomes mayor.
  - Arkansas State Library and Arkansas Census State Data Center headquartered in Little Rock.
- 1980 – Population: 158,461.
- 1981 – City creates the Little Rock Ambulance Authority (Emergency Medical Health Care Facilities Board) as an oversight committee for emergency medical care in the city.
- 1983
  - KLRT-TV begins broadcasting.
  - Sister city agreement established with Kaohsiung, Taiwan.
- 1984 – City begins operating public utility model ambulance service known as MEMS.
- 1985
  - Decorative Arts Museum opens.
  - Pavilion in the Park (shopping centre) in business.
- 1986
  - The Capitol Tower is completed, and at 40 stories and 547 feet (167 m) tall, is the tallest building in Arkansas. The skyscraper's name changed to the TCBY Tower later, and became the Metropolitan Tower as of October 2004. The Stephens Building is also completed, and is 25 stories and 365 feet (111 m) tall when finished. It was named the First South building, and then the Rogers building.
  - KJTM-TV (now KASN) begins broadcasting.
- 1987 – Lottie Shackelford becomes mayor.
- 1990 – Population: 175,795.
- 1991
  - KLVV radio begins broadcasting.
  - The morning Arkansas Gazette and afternoon Arkansas Democrat newspapers merge, commencing publication as the Arkansas Democrat-Gazette.
- 1992
  - Bill Clinton presidential campaign, 1992 headquartered in city.
  - November 3: Bill Clinton is elected President of the United States. He delivers an election night acceptance speech from the front steps of the historic Old State House in downtown Little Rock. He is the first person from the State of Arkansas to be elected president. He was elected to a second term in 1996.
  - Sister city agreement established with Hanam, South Korea.
- 1994 – Sister city agreement established with Changchun, People's Republic of China.
- 1995 – Jim Dailey becomes mayor.
- 1997
  - Butler Center for Arkansas Studies headquartered in Little Rock.
  - 40th anniversary of the Crisis at Central High is marked by the opening of a new National Park Service visitor center.
  - KVUT (now KARZ-TV) begins broadcasting.
  - March 1: An F4 tornado strikes the city's southern and eastern suburbs, killing five (among 15 total deaths throughout the tornado's 27-mile path across Central Arkansas).
- 1999
  - January 21: An F3 tornado (one of three tornadoes to hit Pulaski County during the broader outbreak) causes severe damage to over 235 buildings in neighborhoods south of downtown, and knocks down several trees on the property of the Arkansas Governor's Mansion; three people died as a result of the storm.
  - June 1: American Airlines Flight 1420 crashes after overrunning the runway during landing at Adams Field, killing 11 of the 145 people aboard.
  - Acxiom Corporation headquartered in city.
- 2000
  - Little Rock population: 610,518 (core metropolitan area), 785,024 (primary metropolitan area) in 2000 census.

== 21st century ==
- 2001 – Friendship city agreement established with Newcastle upon Tyne, England.
- 2003
  - First Little Rock Marathon is held. Counting the relays, 1,615 runners participate in the 42.195-kilometre (26.219 mi) race, making it one of the top 25 races in the nation for 2003.
  - Little Rock resident Wesley Kanne Clark, a retired four-star general in the U.S. Army and former Supreme Allied Commander of the North Atlantic Treaty Organization (NATO), announces his intention to run in the presidential primary election for the Democratic Party nomination.
- 2004
  - William J. Clinton Presidential Center opens with a host of dignitaries and celebrities, such as Governor Mike Huckabee, President George W. Bush, and former presidents George H. W. Bush and Jimmy Carter.
  - Arkansas Literary Festival begins.
  - River Rail Streetcar begins operating.
- 2005 – Jack Stephens Center (arena) opens.
- 2006
  - The international charitable organization Heifer International dedicates a $17.5 million world headquarters in downtown Little Rock. The organization announces plans to further develop the 33-acre (130,000 m^{2}) location into the Heifer International Center campus.
  - The Pulaski County Pedestrian and Bicycle Bridge, nicknamed the Big Dam Bridge, opens to the public. It extends 3,463 feet (1,056 m) across the Arkansas River, and is the world's longest bridge specifically built for pedestrians/bicycles.
  - A five-year construction boom of mixed-use, high-rise buildings in downtown's historic River Market district began with over 60 stories of residential and retail property and 240 additional hotel rooms developed. Many residential projects were completed during this period such as the Capital Commerce Center (2002), First Security Center (2004), 300 Third Tower (2006), and River Market Tower (2009).
- 2007
  - Dickey-Stephens Park, home to the Arkansas Travelers minor league baseball team, opens. The ballpark has a capacity of 7,000, and is situated on the Arkansas River in North Little Rock, Arkansas, opposite downtown Little Rock.
  - January: Mark Stodola becomes mayor.

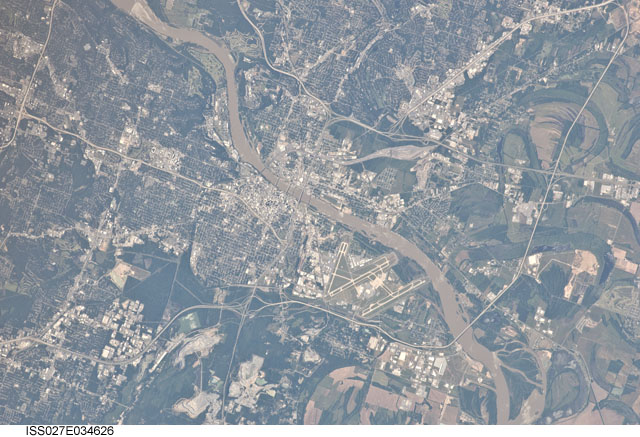
Little Rock, Arkansas as seen from the International Space Station (ISS) in 2011

- 2008
  - Mosaic Templars Cultural Center opens.
  - Wilson History and Research Center of military headgear founded.
- 2010 – Little Rock population: 193,524 (city), 699,757 (core metropolitan area), 877,091 (primary metropolitan area) in 2010 census.
- 2011 – Little Rock's record high temperature of 114 degrees Fahrenheit is recorded by the National Weather Service in August.
- 2014 – Little Rock's primary metropolitan population is 902,443.
- 2015 – French Hill becomes U.S. representative for Arkansas's 2nd congressional district.
- 2018 – Frank Scott Jr becomes the first elected African-American mayor of Little Rock
- 2023 – An EF3 tornado strikes Little Rock and North Little Rock, causing numerous injuries and one fatality

== See also ==
- List of mayors of Little Rock, Arkansas
- Arkansas in the American Civil War
- National Register of Historic Places listings in Little Rock, Arkansas

== Bibliography ==
=== Published in the 19th century ===
- "Little Rock" . Encyclopædia Britannica. Vol. 14 (9th ed.). 1882.
- Sholes' Directory of the City of Little Rock and Argenta, 1883–84.
- Hand-Book to the City of Little Rock. [Little Rock, Press of Gazette Publishing Company. 1897.

=== Published in the 20th century ===
- Little Rock Board of Trade (1902). Annual Report.
- "Arkansas", Rand-McNally Official Railway Guide and Hand Book, Chicago: American Railway Guide Co., 1902, hdl:2027/uva.x000764532
- "Little Rock" . Encyclopædia Britannica. Vol. 16 (11th ed.). 1910. pp. 792–793.
- "Little Rock, Ark.". Automobile Blue Book. Vol. 7. New York: Automobile Blue Book Publishing Co. 1919. hdl:2027/pst.000052908552 – via HathiTrust.
- Federal Writers' Project (1941), "Little Rock", Arkansas: a Guide to the State, American Guide Series, New York, hdl:2027/mdp.39015002678947, OCLC 478887. = Chronology
- Walter B. Hendrickson (1958). "Culture in Early Arkansas: The Antiquarian and Natural History Society of Little Rock". Arkansas Historical Quarterly. 17.
- D. Allen Stokes (1964). "The First Theatrical Season in Arkansas: Little Rock, 1838–1839". Arkansas Historical Quarterly. 23.
- Ira Don Richards. Story of a Rivertown: Little Rock in the Nineteenth Century. Benton, AR: 1969.
- Little Rock Handbook. Little Rock: James W. Bell, 1980.
- Ory Mazar Nergal, ed. (1980), "Little Rock, AR", Encyclopedia of American Cities, New York: E.P. Dutton, OL 4120668M
- Paul D. Lack (1982). "An Urban Slave Community: Little Rock, 1831–1862". Arkansas Historical Quarterly. 41.
- E.F. Chesnutt (1983). "Little Rock Gets Electric Lights". Arkansas Historical Quarterly. 42 (3): 239–253. doi:10.2307/40030760. JSTOR 40030760.
- Hampton F. Roy, Charles Witsell Jr., and Cheryl Griffith Nichols. How We Lived: Little Rock as an American City. Little Rock: August House, 1984.
- Jim Lester and Judy Lester. Greater Little Rock. Norfork, VA: The Donning Company, 1986.
- O'Donnell, William W. (1987). The Civil War Quadrennium: A Narrative History of Day-to-Day Life in Little Rock, Arkansas During the American War Between Northern and Southern States 1861–1865 (2nd ed.). Little Rock, Ark.: Civil War Round Table of Arkansas. LCCN 85-72643 – via Horton Brothers Printing Company.
- Letha Mills and H. K. Stewart. Little Rock: A Contemporary Portrait. Windson Publications: Chatsworth, CA, 1990.
- George Thomas Kurian (1994), "Little Rock, Arkansas", World Encyclopedia of Cities, vol. 1: North America, Santa Barbara, Calif.: ABC-CLIO, ISBN 978-0-87436-649-5 – via Internet Archive (fulltext)
- "The South: Arkansas: Little Rock", USA, Let's Go, New York: St. Martin's Press, 1999, OL 24937240M

=== Published in the 21st century ===
- Thomas Aiello (2006). "The Fading of the Greys: Black Baseball and Historical Memory in Little Rock". Arkansas Historical Quarterly. 65.
- The Little Rock Campaign Tour: A Driving Tour of Sites Along the Route the Union Army Took to Capture the Capitol of Arkansas (PDF) (3rd ed.). Central Arkansas Civil War Heritage Trail Association. September 2007.
- Michael Pierce (2008). "The Mechanics of Little Rock: Free Labor Ideas in Antebellum Arkansas, 1845–1861". Arkansas Historical Quarterly. 67.
- C. Fred Williams. Historic Little Rock: An Illustrated History. San Antonio, TX: Historical Pub. Network, 2008.
