= 2018 Little Rock mayoral election =

- November 6, 2018 (general election); December 4, 2018 (runoff election)
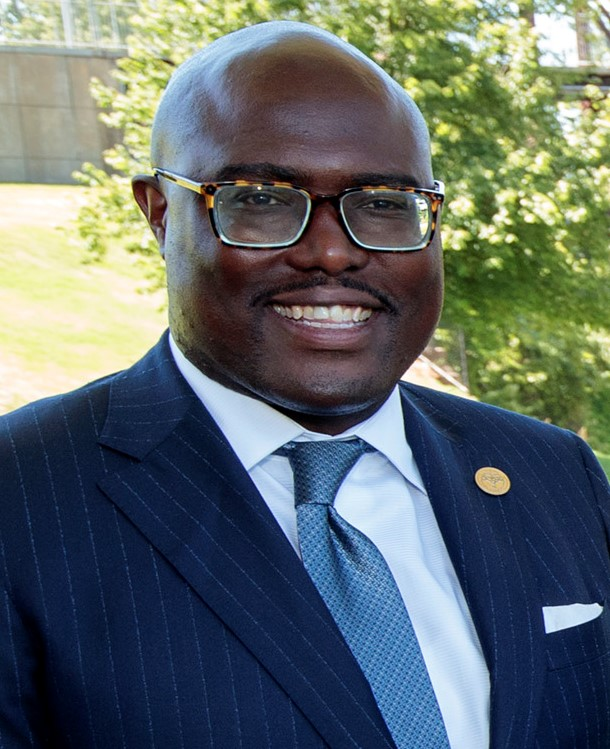

Candidate	Frank Scott Jr.	Baker Kurrus	Warwick Sabin
Party	Nonpartisan	Nonpartisan	Nonpartisan
First round	25,146; 37.10%	19,668; 29.02%	19,157; 28.26%
Runoff	22,668; 58.12%	16,333; 41.88%
Mayor before election
Mark Stodola
Nonpartisan
Elected Mayor
Frank Scott Jr.
Nonpartisan

The 2018 Little Rock mayoral election took place on December 4, 2018, following the general election on November 6, 2018. Incumbent Mayor Mark Stodola declined to seek re-election.

Five candidates ran to succeed him, including former State Highway Commissioner Frank Scott Jr., former School Board member Baker Kurrus, and State Representative Warwick Sabin. In the general election, Scott placed first with 37 percent of the vote, followed by Kurrus with 29 percent and Sabin with 28 percent. Because no candidate received 40 percent of the vote, a runoff election took place between Scott and Kurrus. In the runoff election, Scott defeated Kurrus by a wide margin, winning 58 percent of the vote, and becoming Little Rock's first Black mayor.

== General election ==
=== Candidates ===
- Frank Scott Jr., banker, former State Highway Commissioner
- Baker Kurrus, former Little Rock School Board member
- Warwick Sabin, State Representative
- Vincent Tolliver, writer
- Glen Schwarz, teacher, former journalist

=== Results ===
2018 Little Rock mayoral election results
Party	Candidate	Votes	%
Nonpartisan	Frank Scott Jr.	25,146	37.10%
Nonpartisan	Baker Kurrus	19,668	29.02%
Nonpartisan	Warwick Sabin	19,157	28.26%
Nonpartisan	Vincent Tolliver	2,024	2.99%
Nonpartisan	Glen Schwarz	1,788	2.64%
Total votes		67,783	100.00%

== Runoff election ==
=== Results ===
2018 Little Rock mayoral runoff election results
Party	Candidate	Votes	%
Nonpartisan	Frank Scott Jr.	22,668	58.12%
Nonpartisan	Baker Kurrus	16,333	41.88%
Total votes		39,001	100.00%
