= Warwick Sabin =

American politician

Member of the Arkansas House of Representatives from the 33rd district
- In office January 14, 2013 – January 13, 2019
- Preceded by: Kathy Webb
- Succeeded by: Tippi McCullough

Personal details
- Born: 1976 (age 49–50) New York, New York
- Party: Democratic
- Spouse: Jessica DeLoach Sabin
- Education: University of Arkansas (BA); University of Oxford (MA)
- Profession: Senior Director, U.S. Programs

Warwick Sabin (born 1976) is a former Democratic member of the Arkansas House of Representatives who represented the 33rd district. The 33rd includes Hillcrest, Leawood, Briarwood, Hall High, Capitol View/Stifft's Station, Downtown and the Arkansas State Capitol Building. Representative Sabin was a candidate for Mayor in the 2018 Little Rock mayoral election. Though initially leading in the polls and being the leader in fundraising, he lost the election to Frank Scott Jr.

He also served as senior director of U.S. Programs at Winrock International.

== Early life ==
Sabin was born in New York City. In 1993, he was chosen to represent New York State at Boys Nation, where he met President Bill Clinton in the White House Rose Garden 30 years to the day after Clinton, as the Arkansas delegate to Boys Nation, met President John F. Kennedy. Sabin went on to attend the University of Arkansas, and graduated in 1998 summa cum laude as valedictorian with a degree in political science. He was also elected president of the student government, and during his tenure Sabin led a successful campaign to have all schools in the University of Arkansas System officially observe the federal holiday honoring Dr. Martin Luther King Jr.

In 1997 he won the Harry S. Truman Scholarship, and in 1998 he was named to the USA Today Academic All-Star Team and won the Marshall Scholarship for study at the University of Oxford. While in England, Sabin was the speechwriter to U.S. Ambassador Philip Lader. During the summer of 1999, he was an intern at Foreign Affairs magazine. He left Oxford in June 2000 with a Master of Arts in philosophy, politics and economics.

== Professional career ==
Sabin went from Oxford to Washington, D.C., where he was press secretary for then U.S. Representative Robert Marion Berry. In March 2002, he moved to Little Rock to accept the position of director of development for the William J. Clinton Foundation. Two years later, Sabin became Associate Editor of the Arkansas Times, where he wrote cover stories and a weekly opinion column. During this time, he co-hosted a program on Arkansas public television called "Unconventional Wisdom".

In 2007, he took the post of Associate Vice President for Communications at the University of Central Arkansas. Early in 2008, he was appointed Publisher of the Oxford American after the magazine was the victim of an embezzlement.

Sabin was named to the FOLIO:40 list in 2009, and the Oxford American won the National Magazine Award for Video in 2011.

Sabin announced in August 2013 that he was leaving the Oxford American to create the Arkansas Regional Innovation Hub, where he served as the founding executive director until the Innovation Hub became part of Winrock International in June 2016, and he was named senior director of U.S. Programs.

He writes for The Huffington Post and serves on the board of directors for the Center for a Better South. He received the University of Arkansas Young Alumni Award in 2005 and was named to the Arkansas Business "40 Under 40" in 2003, and he has volunteered and served on the boards of directors for numerous community and nonprofit organizations and projects in Little Rock, including the Public Education Foundation, Little Rock Workforce Investment Board, Arkansas Advocates for Children & Families and the Arkansas Literacy Councils. He is married to Jessica DeLoach Sabin.

== Arkansas House of Representatives ==
In 2012, Sabin was elected to the Arkansas House of Representatives from District 33, which includes downtown Little Rock and other neighborhoods. Both Arkansas Democrat-Gazette columnist John Brummett as well as Talk Business Quarterly named him among the top ten legislators of the 2013 legislative session, and the Arkansas Times called him the "Freshman of the session". Sabin was elected Chair of the 41-member bi-partisan Freshmen Caucus for the 89th General Assembly (2013–14) and he now holds the position of Assistant Speaker Pro Tempore for the 90th General Assembly (2015–16). In 2014, he was named a 2014 Aspen Institute Rodel Fellow, and in 2015 he was named a winner of the NewDEAL "New Ideas Challenge" for his Working Families Opportunity Act.

In the 2018 elections, Sabin ran for mayor of Little Rock. He finished in third place in the nonpartisan election, missing the runoff election, behind eventual winner Frank Scott Jr. and Baker Kurrus.
