= Zeb Ward Building =

- U.S. National Register of Historic Places
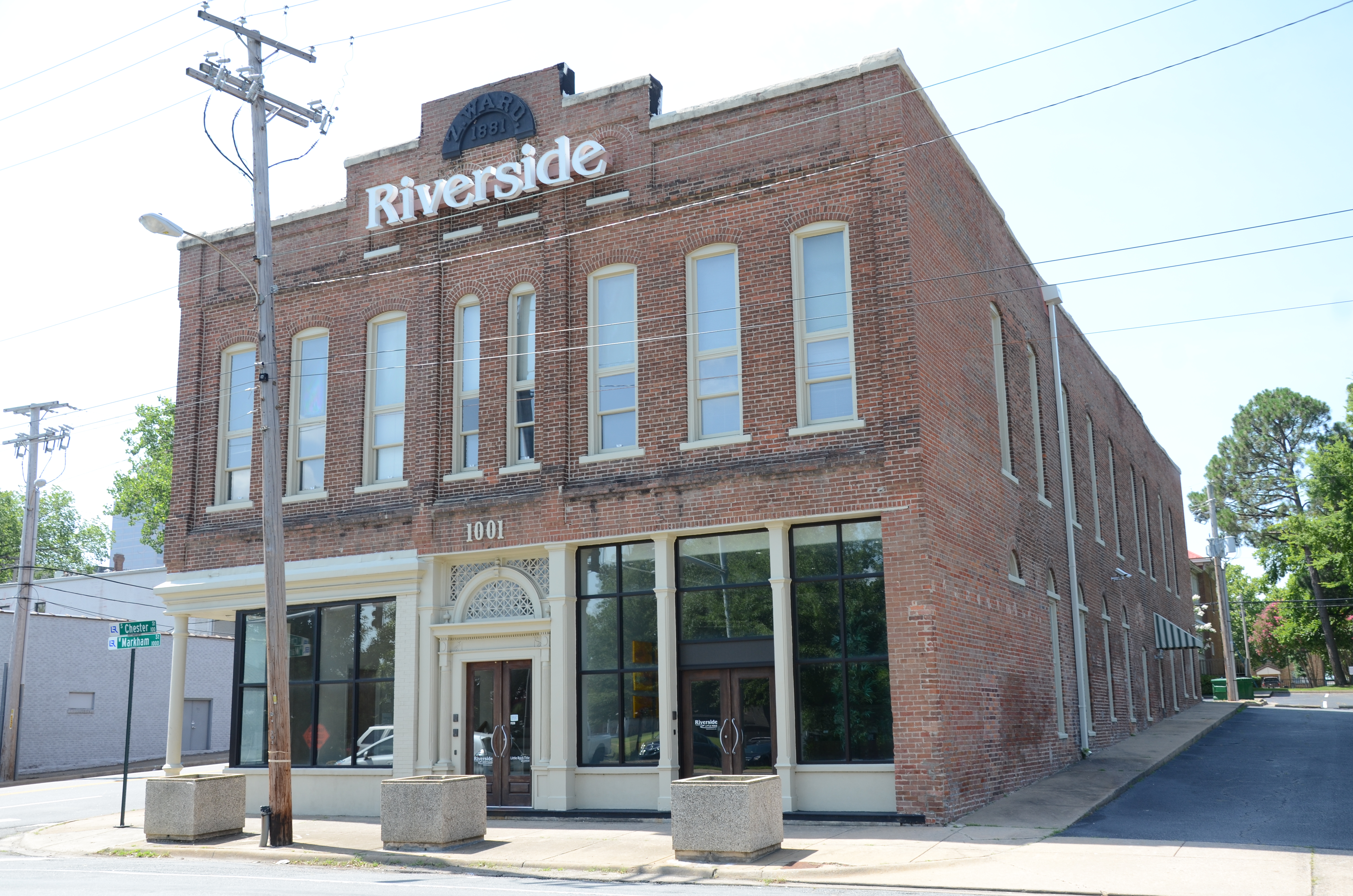

- Location within Arkansas Location within the United States
- Location: 1001-1003 W. Markham St., Little Rock, Arkansas
- Coordinates: 34°44′57″N 92°16′52″W
- Area: less than one acre
- Built: 1881
- Architect: Ward, Zeb
- Architectural style: Italianate
- NRHP reference No.: 78000626
- Added to NRHP: April 19, 1978

The Zeb Ward Building is a historic commercial building located at 1001–1003 West Markham Street in Little Rock, Arkansas. It is a two-story masonry structure, with cast iron storefront surrounds and otherwise brick construction. The building has vernacular commercial Italianate style, with narrow windows at the upper level set in segmented-arch and round-arch openings with brick headers. Its front facade is topped by a stepped parapet. It was built in 1881 by Zeb Ward, and was probably built by prison labor, with its bricks fabricated in the prison yard. Zeb Ward was at the time of its construction the lessee and operator of the Arkansas State Penitentiary.

The building was listed on the National Register of Historic Places in 1978.

== History ==
The land was bought by Zebulon Ward (b. 1822, d. 1884) in 1877 from C. W. Beebe, who had inherited it from his father, Roswell Beebe, in 1860. Roswell was appointed by the United States government to settle land disputes in and around Little Rock, and ended up owning a significant amount of property in the process.

Constructed in 1881, the building first served as an armory for the Quapaw Guards, a civilian militia headquartered in Little Rock.

In March of 1883, a banquet was held for Augustus H. Garland; Governor of Arkansas, US Senator, and Attorney General of the US during the Grover Cleveland presidential administration.

By the mid-1880s, the building had been repurposed for commercial and cultural use, housing a pharmacy, a grocery store, and a private library known as the Marquand.

In 1903, R.E. Shillcutt acquired the pharmacy housed within the building and operated it until approximately 1970. The upper floor functioned as the Quapaw Hotel and later accommodated various hotels and rooming houses. By 1966, the top floor was permanently vacated.

== See also ==
- National Register of Historic Places listings in Little Rock, Arkansas
