= Dan Sprick =

American politician

Dan Travis Sprick

50th Mayor of Little Rock, Arkansas
- In office April 1945 – April 1947
- Preceded by: Charles E. Moyer
- Succeeded by: Sam M. Wassell

Member of the Little Rock City Council
- In office 1935 – 1941

Member of the Arkansas Senate
- In office 1961 – 1970

Personal details
- Born: May 19, 1902 Little Rock, Arkansas, U.S.
- Died: January 12, 1972 (aged 69) Kansas City, Missouri, U.S.
- Party: Democratic
- Spouse: Alliene Beasley Sprick
- Children: 1 daughter

Military service
- Allegiance: United States
- Battles/wars: World War I; World War II

Dan Travis Sprick (May 19, 1902 – January 12, 1972) was a politician in Arkansas who served as a state legislator and as mayor of Little Rock, Arkansas, from April 1945 to April 1947. He was a Democrat. He was an ally of Arkansas governor Orval Faubus.

He was born in Little Rock. He served in the military during World War I and World War II. From 1935 to 1941, he served on the city council. In 1944, he was elected mayor. From 1961 to 1970, he served in the Arkansas Senate.

Sprick was married to Alliene Beasley Sprick and had a daughter.

He opposed Muhammad Ali speaking at the University of Arkansas and sued a newspaper over its editorial on his role in the controversy.
