= Woodrow Wilson Mann =

American politician

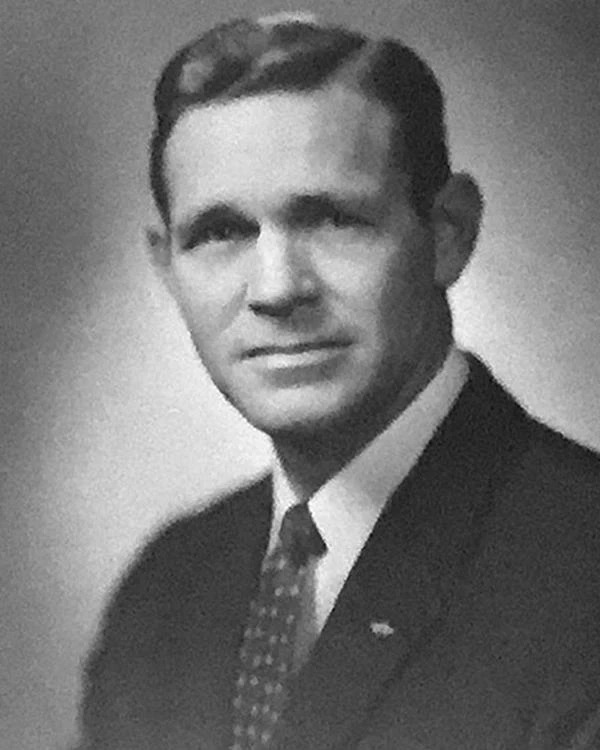

53rd Mayor of Little Rock, Arkansas
- In office January 1, 1956 – December 31, 1957
- Preceded by: Pratt C. Remmel
- Succeeded by: Werner C. Knoop

Personal details
- Born: November 13, 1916 Little Rock, Arkansas, U.S.
- Died: August 6, 2002 (aged 85) Houston, Texas, U.S.
- Resting place: Memorial Oaks Cemetery; Houston, Texas, U.S.
- Party: Democratic
- Spouse: Beverly Mann
- Children: 2
- Education: University of Illinois
- Occupation: Insurance agent

Military service
- Branch/service: United States Navy
- Battles/wars: World War II

Woodrow Wilson Mann (November 13, 1916 – August 6, 2002) was an American politician who was the mayor of the capital city of Little Rock, Arkansas, from 1956 to 1957.

== Biography ==
A Little Rock native, Mann attended the University of Illinois and fought in World War II with the United States Navy in the Pacific Theater of Operations. He was a member of the staff of Admiral Chester Nimitz. Upon his return to the United States, he established an insurance agency. A Democrat, Mann unseated Mayor Pratt C. Remmel, a two-term Republican, in the 1955 municipal election and took office on January 1, 1956.

The Little Rock Nine school desegregation case occurred near the end of Mann's term as mayor in 1957. Outraged by Governor Orval Faubus' order that National Guard troops block the entrance of the students at Little Rock Central High School, Mann sent a telegram to President Dwight D. Eisenhower to request federal troops. Eisenhower soon authorized the troops. After his term as mayor, Mann moved in 1960 to Houston, Texas, where he died in 2002.
