= Arkansas Department of Education =

Government organization in Little Rock, United States

Agency overview
- Formed: 1931; 2019 (current)
- Jurisdiction: Arkansas
- Headquarters: Four Capitol Mall, Little Rock, Arkansas, United States 72201
- Annual budget: ▲US$5,199,164,655
- Agency executives: Jacob Oliva, Secretary; Ivy Pfeffer, Deputy Commissioner, DESE; Stacy Smith, Deputy Commissioner, DESE; Ross White, Director, DTCE; Dr. Maria Markham, Director, ADHE
- Website: ade.arkansas.gov

The Arkansas Department of Education (ADE) is a cabinet-level agency of the Arkansas state government overseeing public education for K-12, higher education institutions, and career and technical education.

The ADE also contains the Arkansas State Library, the Arkansas School for the Deaf, Arkansas School for the Blind and Visually Impaired, and the Arkansas Martin Luther King, Jr. Commission.

== Division of Elementary & Secondary Education ==
The Division of Elementary & Secondary Education (often abbreviated DESE), headquartered in Little Rock, is the state education agency of Arkansas for public schools. Founded in 1931, its responsibilities include accrediting schools, assisting Arkansas schools and their school districts in developing their curricula, approving the textbooks used in state public schools, licensing teachers, and providing continuing education programs. The ADE consists of five divisions: Division of Academic Accountability, Division of Fiscal and Administrative Services, Division of Human Resources, Division of Learning Services, and Division of Research and Technology.

The department maintains the Arkansas Public School Computer Network for the purpose of providing internet access in public schools. ADE also runs a distance learning program through its Distance Learning Center and partners with the Arkansas Educational Television Network on the Arkansas IDEAS portal, which offers professional development courses to improve academic and teaching knowledge and skills of its personnel.

=== Augmented Benchmark Examinations ===
The Augmented Benchmark Examinations is a test required by the Arkansas Department of Education in support of NCLB. Starting with the 2007–08 school year, a criterion-referenced test mandated by the state was merged with the Stanford Achievement Test, Series 10 to form the Augmented Benchmark Examinations. It is administered in grades 3–8 in ELA and mathematics, additionally, grades 5 and 7 are tested in science.

In support of the requirements for No Child Left Behind (NCLB) Act and its requirement for schools to produce Adequate Yearly Progress (AYP), the ADE developed Augmented Benchmark Examinations and its associated Arkansas Comprehensive Testing, Assessment, and Accountability Program (ACTAAP), which has criterion-referenced test (CRT) and norm-referenced test (NRT) components including the Augmented Benchmark Examinations at grades 3 - 8 and The Iowa Tests at grades 1 - 2 and 9.

Per the ADE website, the federal government approved the state's differentiated accountability model, which is named Smart Accountability, in January 2009. The model divides schools into the following categories:

- Achieving, meaning the school has made adequate yearly progress for two or more years.
- Alert, meaning the school did not meet adequate yearly progress this year after meeting it last year and therefore is not in a phase of school improvement
- Targeted School Improvement, meaning a school has been identified as being in school improvement status because one or more, but fewer than 25 percent, of its student subgroups failed to meet adequate yearly progress for two or more consecutive years
- Targeted Intensive Improvement, meaning that a school has remained in Targeted School Improvement status for four or more years.
- Whole School Improvement, meaning that a school has been identified as being in school improvement status because the full test-taking population and/or more than 25 percent of its student subgroups failed to meet adequate yearly progress for two or more consecutive years.
- Whole School Intensive Improvement, meaning a school has remained in Whole School Improvement status for four or more years.
- State Directed, meaning that a school has remained in school improvement status for five or more years. At this level, the state requires schools and districts to implement more interventions and to work with a school improvement team or director that is appointed by or approved by the state.

The 2010 adequate yearly progress calculations show that:

- 446 schools are classified as Achieving
- 209 schools are classified as Alert
- 99 schools are classified as “Targeted Improvement Schools”
- 158 schools are classified as “Whole School Improvement Schools”
- 20 schools are classified as “Targeted Intensive Improvement Schools”
- 65 schools are classified as “Whole School Intensive Improvement Schools”
- 78 schools are classified as “State Directed” schools

=== Smart Core curriculum ===
The Smart Core curriculum is the assumed course of study for all students.

==== 2010-11 to 2012-13 standards ====
Beginning in the 2010–2011 school year, twenty-two units are required for graduation. Of these 22 units, sixteen will be specified units. Of these twenty-two units the following are required:

Smart Core: Sixteen units

- 4 units = English: (9th grade, 10th grade, 11th grade and 12th grade)
- 4 units = Mathematics: All students must take a mathematics course in grade 11 or grade 12. Comparable concurrent credit college courses may be substituted where applicable.
- one unit of Algebra I or Algebra A & B (Grades 7-8 or 8–9),
- one unit of Geometry or Investigating Geometry or Geometry A & B (Grades 8-9 or 9–10),
- one unit of Algebra II,
- fourth math unit range of options: (choice of: Transitions to College Math, Pre-Calculus, Calculus, Trigonometry, Statistics, Computer Math, Algebra III, or an Advanced Placement math.
- 3 units = Natural Science: with lab experience chosen from Physical Science, Biology or Applied Biology/Chemistry, Chemistry, Physics or Principles of Technology I & II or PIC Physics
- 3 units = Social Studies: Civics or Civics/American Government, World History, American History
- 1/2 unit = Oral Communications
- 1/2 unit = Physical Education: only one unit of the required 22 units may be in a physical education course.
- 1/2 unit = Health and Safety
- 1/2 unit = Fine Arts

Career Focus: Six units Total: 22 units

==== 2013-14 and beyond standards ====
Beginning in 2013–2014, all students in grades nine through twelve will follow these graduation requirements. Twenty-two units will be required for graduation. Of these twenty-two units, sixteen will be specified units. Of these units, the following are required:

Smart Core: Sixteen units

- 4 units = English: 9th, 10th, 11th, and 12th
- 4 units = Mathematics: (all students under Smart Core must take a mathematics course in grade 11 or 12 and complete Algebra II.)
- one unit of Algebra I or Algebra A & B* which may be taken in grades 7-8 or 8-9
- one unit of Geometry or Investigating Geometry or Geometry A & B* which may be taken in grades 8-9 or 9-10
- A two-year algebra equivalent or a two-year geometry equivalent may each be counted as two units of the four-unit requirement for the purpose of meeting the graduation requirement, but only serve as one unit each toward fulfilling the Smart Core requirement.
- one unit of Algebra II
- one unit of Choice of: Transitions to College Math, Pre-Calculus, Calculus, Trigonometry, Statistics, Computer Math, Algebra III, or an Advanced Placement math. (Comparable concurrent credit college courses may be substituted where applicable)
- 3 units = Natural Science: three units with lab experience chosen from
- Physical Science
- Biology or Applied Biology/Chemistry
- Chemistry
- Physics or Principles of Technology I & II or PIC Physics
- 3 units = Social Studies:
- 1 unit = World History
- 1 unit = U.S. History
- 1/2 unit = Civics
- 1/2 unit = Oral Communications
- 1/2 unit = Physical Education: only one unit may be applied toward fulfilling the necessary units to graduate.
- 1/2 unit = Health and Safety
- 1/2 unit = Economics – dependent upon the certification of the teacher teaching the course, this can count toward the required three social studies credits or the six required Career Focus elective credits.
- 1/2 unit = Fine Arts
- 6 units = Career Focus

Total: 22 units

== Arkansas Division of Higher Education ==
The Arkansas Division of Higher Education (ADHE) is the staff of the Arkansas Higher Education Coordinating Board. The division promotes the importance of higher education, administers scholarship programs, assists colleges and universities to ensure a coordinated higher education system is available in Arkansas.

Formerly a separate state government department, the ADHE was merged into the expanded ADE as part of the 2019 Arkansas state government transformation.
