= Arkansas Department of Education Distance Learning Center =

State provider of distance learning

The Arkansas Department of Education Distance Learning Center (ADE Distance Learning Center or ADE DLC) is a provider of real-time or synchronous elementary and secondary education classes for students throughout the state of Arkansas. The DLC currently teaches classes to almost 3,200 students, located at more than 100 schools around the state.

== Organizational structure ==
The ADE DLC is a part of the Arkansas Department of Education, as its name implies. However, the fiscal agent for the ADE DLC is Dawson Educational Services Co-op, based in Arkadelphia, Arkansas. The day-to-day operations of the DLC are overseen by a Program Coordinator and an Instructional Coordinator. There is a Personnel Policies Committee, elected by the teachers, that works to improve the personnel policies of the ADE DLC. The ADE DLC employs 25 teachers, all Highly Qualified (as outlined by the No Child Left Behind Act) in the subject areas that they teach.

=== ADE Oversight ===
The Arkansas Department of Education has established official rules and guidelines regarding distance learning in Arkansas. Specifically, there are three guidelines:

- All courses must be approved and meet curriculum frameworks and content standards.
- All instructors for distance learning must be properly licensed or approved.
- A properly trained adult must be present at all times when distance learning students meet as a group.

== ADE Distance Learning Center Foundational Commitments ==
The ADE Distance Learning Center has the following four Foundational Commitments, which summarize its purpose:

- Address the teacher-availability dilemma by delivering quality distance-learning courses to areas of Arkansas where teacher availability is limited.
- Allow state-required courses at various times of the day, in order to provide greater scheduling flexibility for students.
- Enrich and enhance curriculum by offering web-based resources, elective courses, and Advanced Placement classes.
- Provide professional development and instructional support by using technology and web-based resources for training and training in integrating technology into the classroom.

These Foundational Commitments are closely correlated to the four Distance Learning Focus Areas of the Arkansas Department of Education.

== History of the ADE Distance Learning Center ==
In 2000, Jim Boardman, then Assistant Commissioner of Information Technology for the Arkansas Department of Education, created a distance learning program under the Arkansas Department of Education that would provide Arkansas students with course content aligned to the Arkansas Curriculum standards and that would also provide the course content required by the state for high school graduation. At this time, there were two other distance learning providers in the state, but none with this specific objective. Administrators were hired to establish the foundation for such an institution, and in May 2001, the first teachers were interviewed and hired. The first group of teachers included one math teacher, one English and journalism teacher, and five Spanish teachers.

The first classes at the ADE DLC began in August 2001. At that time, three schools participated, with a total of 65 students taking classes from the ADE DLC. During the 2009 - 2010 academic year, the ADE DLC will provide instruction to 3200 students from 100 schools in the state. During the first year of operation, most of the classes taught were delivered using Enhanced Audio Graphics technology. This technology enabled the content to be pushed to the desktop computer of the students and the audio communication was accomplished using audio bridging services from telephone companies. However, Compressed Interactive Video (CIV), was used in other classes, so that the teacher and students could see and speak to each other in real time and communicate more effectively. As distance learning in Arkansas grew, the state legislature apportioned funds to allow schools to buy CIV equipment. Currently, 243 out of 245 school districts have CIV systems connected to the state video network. Today, all ADE DLC classes are provided using CIV technology. In addition, the teachers push the class content to the student computers using the IBM/Lotus Sametime program. This program provides an online meeting room and whiteboard, to facilitate the presentation of materials and communication between the students and their teachers.

The ADE Distance Learning Center requires that schools provide a networked computer for each student during class. Within Arkansas, the ADE Distance Learning Center was instrumental in the implementation of a 1:1 student-to-computer ratio to enable students to benefit from the interactivity provided by integrating CIV technology with real-time desktop technology. Equity is achieved, since all students may participate in the online class meetings, test online, and otherwise take advantage of the vast resources of the internet.

In the fall of 2009, the ADE DLC began hosting videos on a Flash server at its Website, to provide students with additional resources to help them succeed in their classes. These videos are recorded and edited in-house by the same teachers that teach the classes.

== Awards and recognition ==
The ADE Distance Learning Center has been the recipient of several prestigious awards. Some of these awards have gone to the institution, while others have recognized individual teachers.

- United States Distance Learning Association (USDLA) Bronze Award 2007 for Best Practices for Distance Learning Programming.
- USDLA Bronze Award 2008 for Best Practices for Distance Learning Programming.
- USDLA Gold Award 2008 for Best Practices in Distance Learning Teaching - Cynthia Green, English teacher.
- USDLA Platinum Award 2010 for Best Practices in Distance Learning Teaching - Teresa Sheree Crites, English and Language Arts teacher
- USDLA Platinum Award 2010 for Best Practices in Distance Learning Teaching - Erin Radke, Journalism teacher
- Arkansas Distance Learning Association (ARDLA) award for Outstanding Distance Education Program 2009.
- ARDLA Outstanding Distance Education Faculty 2009 award - Sheree Crites, English teacher.
