= Lottie Shackelford =

American politician (born 1941)

68th Mayor of Little Rock, Arkansas
- In office January 1987 – December 1988
- Preceded by: Thomas Prince
- Succeeded by: Floyd Villines

Personal details
- Born: April 30, 1941 (age 85)
- Party: Democratic
- Education: Philander Smith College
- Occupation: Politician
- Known for: Serving the longest tenure as vice chair of the Democratic National Committee (DNC)

Lottie Lee Holt Shackelford (born April 30, 1941) is an American politician. Shackelford was the first woman and first Black woman appointed mayor of Little Rock, Arkansas in 1987. She remains the only Black female who has ever held this position. Throughout the 1980s, Shackelford worked extensively with the Democratic National Committee, beginning with her work on Bill Clinton’s campaigns. in 1993, President Bill Clinton appointed her to the Board of Directors of the Overseas Private Investment Corporation (OPIC), making her the first African-American woman to serve in that role. She was inducted into the Arkansas Black Hall of Fame in 1993. Throughout the 2000s, 2010s, and 2020s she has remained an active member of the Democratic Party, partially through her work on the Democratic National Committee. Additionally, she is the longest serving vice chair of the Democratic National Committee (DNC), having held the office for over 20 years.

== Early life and education ==
Lottie Lee Holt Shackelford was born in Little Rock, Arkansas, to parents Curtis Holt Sr. and Bernice Linzy Holt. She is one of four children. Shackelford’s father was a porter and chef for the Union Pacific Railroad. He also worked as a truck driver. Her mother held multiple jobs in Little Rock including working in a school cafeteria and at a manufacturing plant. Shackelford attended Little Rock's all black high school Horace Mann and graduated in 1958.

Shackelford received a Bachelor of Arts degree in Business Administration from Philander Smith College in Little Rock, Arkansas. In the fall of 1958, she first enrolled at Philander Smith College, intending to become a microbiologist. In 1963, she left school because her father fell ill and died. In 1979, when her eldest child was a senior in high school, Shackelford returned to obtain her Bachelor’s degree. She was a Senior Fellow at the Arkansas Institute of Politics and a fellow at the John F. Kennedy School of Government, Harvard University.

== Career ==
After graduating from Philander Smith College, Shackelford worked with the Urban League of Greater Little Rock and the University of Arkansas for Medical Sciences. Shackelford’s first entry into politics occurred in 1974 when she ran for a position on the Board of Directors for Little Rock. Shackelford was involved with a group called Black Female Action which was crucial to her entry into the political sphere. At the time, the group was trying to get the Arkansas Gazette to include photos of Black brides on the front page of their society section. This work led to the group's involvement in more political matters, leading members to encourage Shackelford to run. Out of the five candidates that ran in 1974, Shackelford finished third. A White businessman won the position. In 1978, due to a vacancy on the Board of Directors, Shackelford was appointed for a two year term. After that term was finished, Shackelford ran for reelection in 1980 and won. She was re-elected citywide twice. In 1987, the Board of Directors for Little Rock elected her to be mayor, a role she served in until 1991. During her tenure in local government, Shackelford directed liaison activities for minority businesses and held leadership positions at the National League of Cities. She also presented papers on local government, economic development, and electoral politics nationally and internationally, and led economic trade missions and conducted lecture tours in Europe, Asia, and Africa.

In the 1980s, Shackelford became more involved with the Democratic party, beginning with her work for Bill Clinton’s campaign. In 1980, Shackelford was selected to be a delegate for the Democratic National Convention. For the past several decades, Shackelford has worked with the Democratic Party at the state and national level. She served as Secretary, Vice Chair, and Chair of the Arkansas State Democratic Committee, and was elected Secretary of the National Association of State Democratic Chairs. Ms. Shackelford served as Co-Chair of the Platform Committee in 1984 and the Rules Committee in 1988, and she currently serves on the Resolutions Committee.

Shackelford's experience also includes advising presidential candidates, working on White House transition teams, and representing a Presidential administration abroad. In 1992, she was a Deputy Campaign manager for the Clinton/Gore Presidential Campaign and was later appointed Co-Director of Intergovernmental Affairs for the Clinton Transition Team. In 1993, President Clinton appointed Shackelford as a US Delegate to the United Nations Commission on the Status of Women, Vienna, Austria. In 1994, Shackelford started a new role as the executive vice president of Global USA, INC.

In her role as DNC Vice Chair of Voter Registration and Participation, Shackelford traveled across the country and around the world, sharing the Democratic Party's message and engaging voters in the political process. She has participated in political forums of other countries, including Azerbaijan, Russia, West Germany and Taiwan, and she has observed elections in Romania and the Baltic States. In 2014, she ran the Women’s Caucus of the Democratic National Committee. In 2024, Shackelford announced the Arkansas state delegation vote at the Democratic National Convention. Shackelford stays active in politics by giving interviews and encouraging younger generations to continue her work.

== Family and personal life ==
In 1958, Shackelford married Calvin Henry Shackelford Jr., an airman who was also from Little Rock. In their time together, Shackelford traveled with him to several assignments on U.S. Air Force bases. They had a son and two daughters before their separation in 1984.

== Awards ==
- Registry of Outstanding Men and Women, Esquire magazine
- Woman of the Year, the Arkansas Democrat-Gazette
- 1993: Arkansas Black Hall of Fame inductee
- 1998: Mary Church Terrell Award, Delta Sigma Theta
- 2016: Arkansas Women's Hall of Fame inductee

== See also ==
- List of first African-American mayors
