= Southwest Little Rock =

Neighborhood in Little Rock, Arkansas, United States

Coordinates: 34.66°N 92.39°W

Southwest Little Rock is a neighborhood in the southwestern area of Little Rock, Arkansas.

== Notable people ==
- Keith Jackson - Former professional American football tight end and color commentator on radio broadcasts for the Arkansas Razorbacks.
- Frank Scott Jr. - politician, current mayor of Little Rock
