= Roswell Beebe =

American businessman and politician

16th Mayor of Little Rock, Arkansas
- In office April 1849 – February 1850
- Preceded by: Samuel H. Webb
- Succeeded by: D. J. Baldwin

Personal details
- Born: December 22, 1795
- Died: September 27, 1856 (aged 60)
- Resting place: Mount Holly Cemetery, Little Rock, Arkansas, U.S.
- Occupation: Politician, businessman, land speculator

Roswell Beebe (December 22, 1795 – September 27, 1856) was an American businessman, land speculator, and politician in Arkansas during the 19th century. Originally from New York, he moved to Arkansas in the 1830s, where he became influential in the development of Little Rock. On September 25, 1839, he received the original patent for the town, signed by President Martin Van Buren.

Beebe is best known for his role in resolving land disputes in and around Little Rock. In 1839, he purchased land from the federal government that included much of present-day downtown Little Rock. This acquisition helped settle longstanding legal conflicts over land claims in the area, as he later distributed portions of the land to existing settlers.

In addition to his land dealings, Beebe was involved in politics and served as the mayor of Little Rock from 1849 to 1850. He was also active in railroad development, recognizing the importance of transportation infrastructure for the region’s economic growth.

Beebe's legacy is reflected in the city’s expansion and stability during its formative years. His contributions were significant enough that Beebe, Arkansas, a town in White County, was named in his honor.

== Bibliography ==
- Atkinson, J. H., ed. "Letters from Solon Borland to Roswell Beebe." Arkansas Historical Quarterly 18 (Autumn 1959): 287–290.
- "Roswell Beebe Materials, 1795–1925." Butler Center for Arkansas Studies. Central Arkansas Library System, Little Rock, Arkansas.
