= Pratt Remmel =

American politician (1915–1991)

52nd Mayor of Little Rock, Arkansas
- In office January 1952 – December 1955
- Preceded by: Sam M. Wassell
- Succeeded by: Woodrow Wilson Mann

Personal details
- Born: Pratt Cates Remmel; October 26, 1915 Little Rock, Arkansas, U.S.
- Died: May 14, 1991 (aged 75)
- Party: Republican
- Spouse: Catherine Couch (m. 1940)
- Children: 3+
- Relatives: Harmon L. Remmel (great-uncle); Harvey C. Couch (father-in-law)
- Education: Little Rock High School; University of Virginia (BA)
- Occupation: Politician

Pratt Cates Remmel (born Little Rock, Arkansas, October 26, 1915; died May 14, 1991) was an American politician, businessman, and public servant. He is best known for serving two terms as the mayor of Little Rock (1952–1956), the first Republican elected to the office since 1887, and for his run for governor of Arkansas in 1954 against Orval Faubus.

== Early life and family ==
The Remmel family was deeply involved in Republican party politics in Arkansas. Pratt Remmel's great uncle Harmon L. Remmel, a businessman and banker, was first a lieutenant of party boss Powell Clayton and then, from about 1913 to his death in 1927, controlled the party himself. Pratt Remmel's father Augustus C. Remmel (1882–1920) was a leader of the "Lily-white movement" among Arkansas Republicans and sometimes clashed with his uncle; he was chairman of the state Republican committee at the time of his death at the age of 38. His mother Ellen "Nell" (Cates) Remmel (1888–1961) served on the national Republican committee for many years.

Pratt Remmel's father died when he was five years old; he and his five brothers and sisters were raised by their mother. Remmel graduated from Little Rock High School in 1933 and went on to the University of Virginia in Charlottesville, Virginia, earning a BA in economics there in 1937.

== Political career ==
Returning to Arkansas, Remmel immediately entered politics, running unsuccessfully for the Little Rock city council in 1938. In 1940 he became a member of the Pulaski County Republican Party executive committee, the first of many positions he was to hold in the Arkansas Republican Party. On June 15, 1940, he married Catherine Couch (1918–2006), daughter of powerful Arkansas businessman Harvey C. Couch.

After serving as a Navy flight instructor during World War II and building an insurance business after the war, Remmel ran for mayor of Little Rock in 1951 and trounced two-term Democratic mayor Sam Wassell, who had broken local tradition by running for a third term. Remmel was re-elected in 1953.

Remmel was the Republican candidate for governor in 1954, losing to Orval Faubus. Remmel received almost 38% of the vote, which was a very good showing for a Republican at the time; the 1952 nominee, Jefferson Speck, had managed only 12.5% against Democrat Francis Cherry, while the 1956 nominee, Roy Mitchell, collected 19.3% against Faubus.

Remmel ran for mayor of Little Rock again in 1955, losing narrowly to Democrat Woodrow Wilson Mann.

== Later activities ==
After his terms as mayor Remmel did not run for elected office again, but he took on volunteer roles with the American Legion and American Red Cross, as well as serving on the Arkansas River Basin Commission and as chairman of the Arkansas Waterways Commission, a state advisory committee intended to promote navigation on Arkansas rivers.

== Family ==
Remmel and his wife Catherine had at least three children, Pratt Remmel Jr., Rebecca Remmel, and Catherine Ellen Remmel Matthews (1941–2020), who became a successful real estate agent and marketing expert and also led the Department of Arkansas Heritage from 1997 to 2002.
