= Arkansas State Library =

State agency of Arkansas

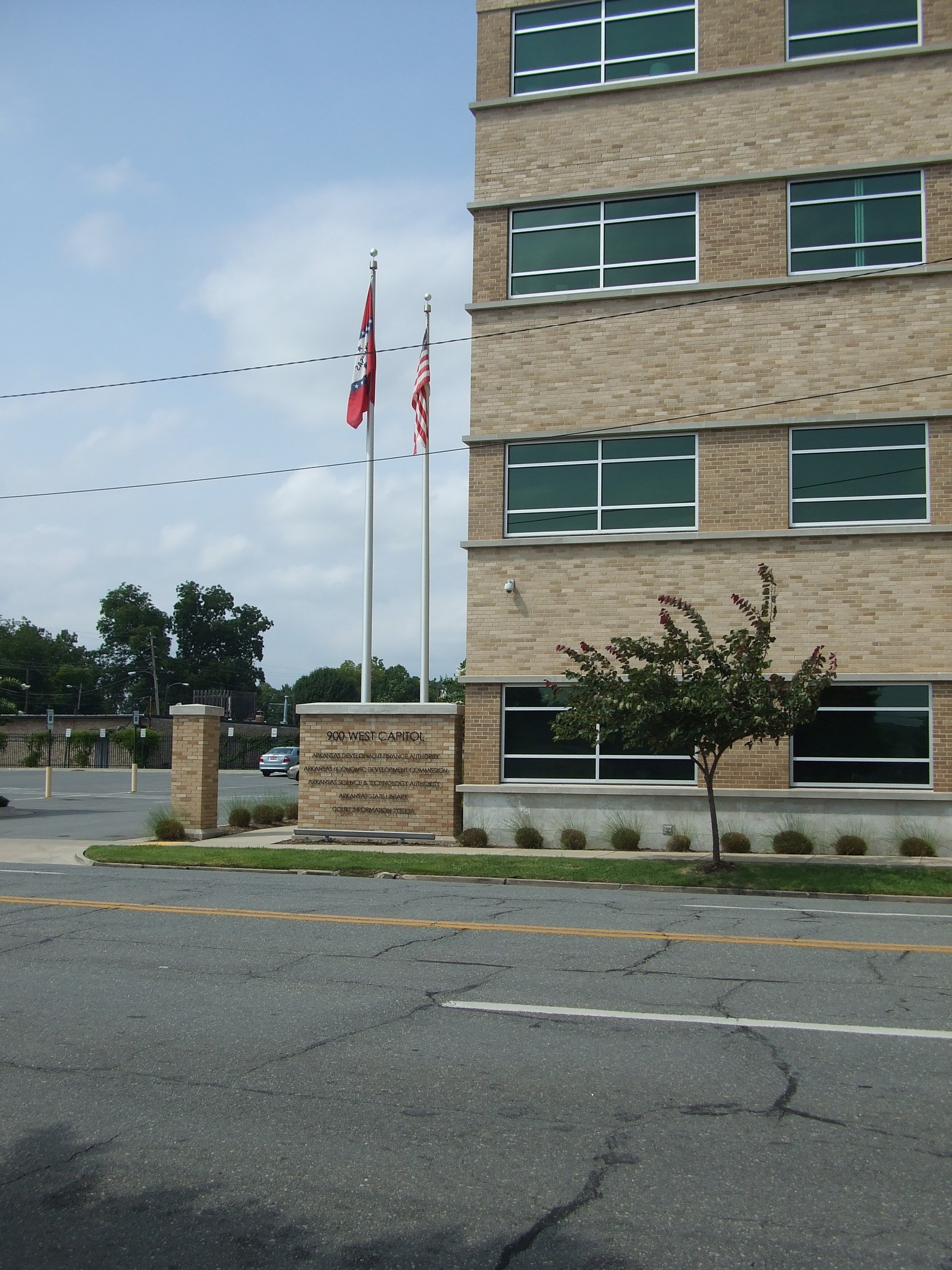
- 900 West Capitol Avenue in Little Rock
- 34°44′46″N 92°16′51″W
- Location: Little Rock, Arkansas, United States
- Type: Special library
- Scope: State and local government publications, Federal depository library, Patent and Trademark depository
- Established: 1935, as the Arkansas Library Commission; 1979, as the Arkansas State Library

Collection
- Size: 2,600,000+

Other information
- Director: Jennifer Chilcoat
- Employees: 42
- Parent organization: Arkansas Department of Education
- Affiliation: Center for the Book (Arkansas affiliate); Federal Depository Library Program; Arkansas Digital Library Consortium
- Website: www.library.arkansas.gov

Arkansas State Library (ASL) is a special library which operates as a state agency under the Arkansas Department of Education, within the Arkansas state government. It provides information about resources for state agencies, legislators and legislative staff. The library also provides guidance and support for the development of local public libraries and library services. ASL provides resources, services and leadership for the educational, informational and cultural needs of Arkansas citizens.

== History ==
The Arkansas General Assembly created the Arkansas Library Commission in 1935. Funding began in 1937. The commission operated from headquarters in Little Rock. The commission provided library services across the state, by mailing books through what was called the Post Office Department until 1971, offering guidance on collection development, and awarding grants to support library initiatives. In 1979, the legislature replaced the commission with the newly established Arkansas State Library.

== General public ==
The Arkansas State Library offers various programs and services for the general public, including Arkansas Center for the Book, Bookreporter.com, Document Collection, Information about the Arkansas General Assembly (Legislators & Committees/Meetings & Events/Acts & Bill Status), Library for the Blind and Physically Handicapped; Information Services such as reference assistance and Ask a Librarian, Library Card registration, Online Catalog, assistance with Patents and Trademarks as the only Patent and Trademark Resource Center (in association with the United States Patent and Trademark Office) in Arkansas, Resource Assistance In Seeking Employment (R.A.I.S.E), social media (Facebook, Twitter); Newsletter, Public Library Directory, Summer Reading Program, and the Traveler Online Database Program.

== Librarians and trustees ==
The ASL provides librarians and library trustees with numerous services, such as the Arkansas Center for the Book, Bibilostat Collect and Bibliostat Connect Log-in, Federal & State Documents, E-rate Assistance for Public Libraries, Grant Information, ILL, and the Library for the Blind and Print Disabled.

== State government employees and legislators ==
State government employees and legislators have access to the State Library's online databases, reference assistance, federal and state documents; and may benefit from using Inter-library Loan, Library for the Blind and Print Disabled, and overall information services.

== Teachers and students ==
Many services are offered for teachers and students, including America's Story from America's Library (Library of Congress for Kids), Arkansas Center for the Book, Arkansas Department of Education, Ben's Guide to U.S. Government for Kids (K-2;3-5;9-12; Parents & Teachers), Book Awards & Reading Lists, and Letters about Literature.

== Library for the Blind and Print Disabled ==
The Arkansas Regional Library for the Blind and Print Disabled is part of the Library of Congress National Library Service for the Blind and Physically Handicapped (NLS) network and the Arkansas State Library. Arkansas citizens unable to use regular print material may borrow popular books and magazines in recorded or Braille format free of charge.

== Reference and online resources ==
Information Services (formerly known as State Library Services) at the Arkansas State Library was established in 1979 to help provide reference services, access to printed and/or electronic materials and to online information including social media along with work-related Interlibrary Loan services to state agencies and the state legislature. The State Library is part of a network of libraries (Patent and Trademark Resource Centers) throughout the United States that provides free patent and trademark information. The State Library also provides free library cards for use by the citizens of Arkansas.

== See also ==
- List of Arkansas state agencies
- List of libraries in the United States
