= Horace Mann Senior High School =

School in Arkansas, United States

Horace Mann Senior High School (1955–1965) was a high school for African American students in Little Rock, Arkansas, the state capital. It was turned into a middle school.

Edwin Luther Hawkins Sr. (1914–1974) served as principal.

The school was named for Horace Mann (1796–1859), a U.S. congressman and education reformer remembered as "Father of American Education." The original desegregation pan for the area called for the school to remain predominantly African American.

It succeeded Dunbar Junior-Senior High School which was to become a middle school. Horace Mann High School had 37 classrooms, a gymnasium, and a cafeteria. Additions were made in subsequent years. The high school was converted into a middle school for 8th and 9th graders. It then became a junior high in 1978 with the addition of 7th graders. In 1983, it was transformed into a science focused magnet school with an arts program added in 1987. Mann Magnet School offers magnet programs in the sciences as well as visual and performing arts.

Arkansas governor Orval Faubus closed schools for a year. The Central Arkansas Library System held a presentation on the school and its history with alumni presenters.

L. M. Christophe served as principal.
