= List of mayors of Little Rock, Arkansas =

Mayor of Little Rock, Arkansas

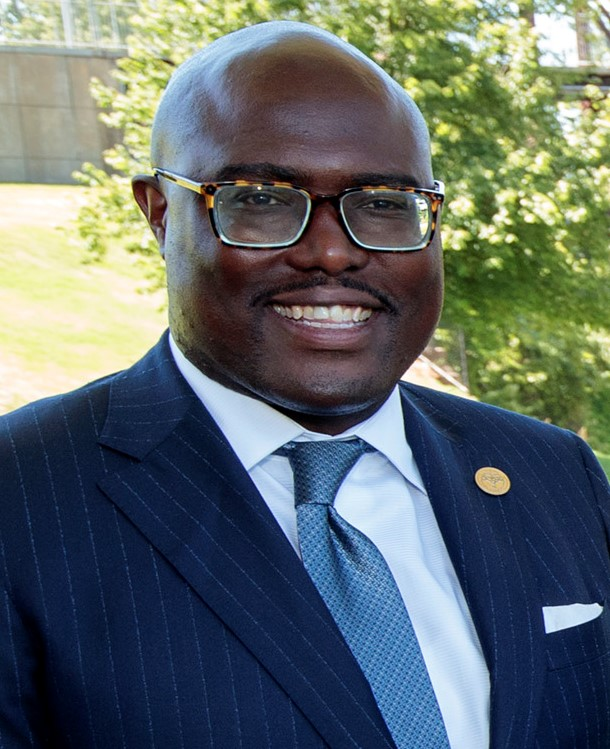
- Incumbent; Frank Scott, Jr. since January 2019
- First holder: Matthew Cunningham

The mayor of Little Rock, Arkansas serves as the chief executive of the city government. Little Rock was first incorporated as a town in November 1831 and redefined as a city under a new charter in November 1835. During the American Civil War, Little Rock was captured and occupied by Union forces beginning September 21, 1863, leaving the city without a civilian government until December 1865. Starting in November 1869, the president of the city council presided over council meetings and signed ordinances, performing many of the duties formerly ascribed to the mayor. In accordance with new Constitution of Arkansas and new city charter, the mayor resumed duties previously split between mayor and president of the city council in March 1875. On November 6, 1956, Little Rock voters approved a move to the city manager form of government to take effect in the next year and on November 11, 1957, voters selected the first city board of directors under the city manager form of government. Under this form, the city board selected mayor from among its membership to serve for a two-year term. Beginning in 1994, mayors were elected to a four-year term by citywide election.

== Trustees (1825–1832) ==
From October 1825 through January 1832, Little Rock was governed by an elected board of trustees. Bernard Smith presided over the board through 1828, Dr. Matthew Cunningham presided in 1829, and John McClain presided in 1830 and 1831.

== Mayors (from 1836) ==
| Number | Person | Image | Mayor | In office | Notes | Ref. |
|---|---|---|---|---|---|---|
| 1 | 1 | | Dr. Matthew Cunningham | January 1832 – January 1833 | First mayor of the Town of Little Rock. Cunningham’s descendants continue to live in the city into the 21st century. His great-great-great-great grandson serves as pastor of Westover Hills Presbyterian Church. | |
| 2 | 2 | | Rev. W. W. Stevenson | January 1833 – January 1834 | | |
| 3 | 3 | | Elijah A. More | January 1834 – January 1835 | | |
| 4 | 4 | | David Fulton | January 1835 – November 1835 | | |
| 5 | 5 | | James Pitcher | November 1835 – December 1837 | First mayor of the City of Little Rock | |
| 6 | 6 | | Jesse Brown | January 1838 – January 1841 | From April 1839 through November 1839, Alderman Nicholas Peay acted as mayor due to prolonged absence of Mayor Brown. | |
| 7 | 7 | | Dr. Samuel H. Webb | January 1841 – January 1842 | | |
| 8 | 8 | | John Widgery | January 1842 – May 1842 | | |
| 9 | 9 | | Samuel G. Trowbridge | May 1842 – January 1843 | Elevated to mayor from mayor pro-tempore upon resignation of previous mayor. Resigned upon arrest for running a counterfeit ring. | |
| 10 | 10 | | Thomas S. Reynolds | January 1843 – September 1843 | Elevated to mayor from mayor pro-tempore upon resignation of previous mayor. | |
| 11 | 11 | | Eli Colby | September 1843 – January 1844 | Elevated to mayor from mayor pro-tempore upon resignation of previous mayor. | |
| 12 | 12 | | William Brown, Sr. | January 1844 – January 1845 | | |
| 13 | 13 | | Lambert J. Reardon | January 1845 – January 1847 | | |
| 14 | 14 | | Dr. Roderick Lathrop (R.L.) Dodge | January 1847 – January 1848 | | |
| 15 | (7) | | Dr. Samuel H. Webb (2nd term) | January 1848 – April 1849 | | |
| 16 | 15 | | Roswell Beebe | April 1849 – February 1850 | Elevated to mayor from mayor pro-tempore upon resignation of previous mayor. | |
| 17 | 16 | | D. J. Baldwin | February 1850 – January 1851 | Elevated to mayor from mayor pro-tempore upon resignation of previous mayor. | |
| 18 | 17 | | John Elliot Knight | January 1851 – January 1852 | | |
| 19 | 18 | | Andre J. Hutt | January 1852 – January 1854 | | |
| 20 | 19 | | Thomas D. Merrick | January 1854 – January 1855 | | |
| 21 | 20 | | Charles (C.P.) Bertrand | January 1855 – January 1857 | Stepson of first Little Rock Mayor, Dr. Matthew Cunningham. | |
| 22 | 21 | | William E. Ashley | January 1857 – January 1859 | | |
| 23 | 22 | | Gordon N. Peay | January 1859 – January 1861 | Son of Alderman Nicholas Peay who served as Mayor Pro-Tem during absence of Mayor Brown. | |
| 24 | (21) | | William E. Ashley (2nd term) | January 1861 – September 1863 | | |
Little Rock was occupied by the Union Army during the Civil War and controlled by federal forces from September 21, 1863 through December 1865.
| 25 | 23 | | Dr. J. J. McAlmont | January 1866 – January 1867 | | |
| 26 | 24 | | J. W. Hopkins | January 1867 – February 1868 | | |
| 27 | 25 | | John Wassell | February 1868 – December 1868 | Appointed by military to replace elected mayor. | |
| 28 | 26 | | A. K. Hartman | January 1869 – November 1871 | The City Council suspended Hartman in February 1870; a court order overturned that in June 1870. In January 1871, he was again suspended by the Council and J. G. Botsford was declared acting mayor, though Hartman still claimed the title of mayor through the remainder of his term in November 1871. | |
| 29 | 27 | | Jefferson G. Botsford | January 1871 – November 1871 | Appointed acting mayor in January 1871 and served through November 1871. Mayor Hartman was never officially removed from office, so Botsford was never technically mayor. He has been historically listed as a mayor of Little Rock, however. | |
| 30 | 28 | | Robert F. Catterson | November 1871 – November 1873 | | |
| 31 | 29 | | Frederick Kramer | November 1873 – April 1875 | | |
| 32 | 30 | | John Gould Fletcher | April 1875 – April 1881 | First mayor under new city charter. Father of John Gould Fletcher (Jr.) | |
| 33 | (29) | | Frederick Kramer (2nd term) | April 1881 – April 1887 | | |
| 34 | 31 | | William G. Whipple | April 1887 – April 1891 | Ran for governor, son-in-law of Mayor R. L. Dodge. | |
| 35 | 32 | | Henry Lewis (H.L.) Fletcher | April 1891 – April 1893 | Brother of Mayor John Gould Fletcher. | |
| 36 | 33 | | M. G. Hall | April 1893 – April 1895 | | |
| 37 | 34 | | James A. Woodson | April 1895 – May 1900 | Due to obligations with his business affairs, resigned in April 1900 to be effective upon election of his successor. | |
| 38 | 35 | | W. R. Duley | May 1900 – April 1903 | Elected in a special election in May 1900. First time a special election had been used to fill mayoral vacancy. | |
| 39 | 36 | | Warren E. Lenon | April 1903 – April 1908 | Due to obligations with his business affairs, resigned at first meeting of city council held in the new City Hall, which he had championed. | |
| 40 | 37 | | John Herndon Hollis | April 1908 – June 1908 | Though technically only mayor pro-tempore selected by City Council to serve until special election for next mayor, he has traditionally been included in lists of mayors of Little Rock. He never gave up his alderman seat on city council and remained on council after special election. | |
| 41 | (35) | | W. R. Duley (2nd term) | June 1908 – April 1911 | Chosen in a special election to fill vacancy created by resignation of Mayor Lenon. Due to illness, Mayor Duley took a leave of absence from February 20, 1911 through the remainder of his term. Alderman John S. Odom was selected by the council as Acting Mayor. | |
| 42 | 38 | | Charles E. Taylor | April 1911 – April 1919 | | |
| 43 | 39 | | Ben D. Brickhouse | April 1919 – April 1925 | | |
| 44 | 40 | | Charles E. Moyer | April 1925 – April 1929 | | |
| 45 | 41 | | Pat L. Robinson | April 1929 – April 1931 | | |
| 46 | 42 | | Horace A. Knowlton | April 1931 – April 1935 | | |
| 47 | 43 | | Richard E. (R.E.) Overman | April 1935 – April 1939 | | |
| 48 | 42 | | John Vines (J.V.) Satterfield, Jr. | April 1939 – April 1941 | Due to illness, Mayor Satterfield took a leave of absence from January 1 through March 31, 1941. Alderman E. W. Gibb was selected by Council as Acting Mayor. | |
| 49 | (40) | | Charles E. Moyer (2nd term) | April 1941 – April 1945 | | |
| 50 | 45 | | Dan T. Sprick | April 1945 – April 1947 | | |
| 51 | 46 | | Sam M. Wassell | April 1947 – December 1951 | Starting date for mayoral terms moved from April to January. Grandson of Little Rock Mayor John Wassell. | |
| 52 | 47 | | Pratt C. Remmel | January 1952 – December 1955 | First Republican elected to the post since 1891. Mayor Remmel took a leave of absence to run for Governor from August 31 through December 13, 1954. Alderman Fred W. Parris was chosen by city council to serve as acting mayor. | |
| 53 | 48 | | Woodrow Wilson Mann | January 1956 – November 1957 | Last mayor under the mayor–council form of government. | |
| 54 | 49 | | Werner C. Knoop | November 1957 – December 1962 | First mayor under the city manager form of government. | |
| 55 | 50 | | Byron R. Morse | January 1963 – December 1964 | | |
| 56 | 51 | | Harold "Sonney" Henson, Jr. | January 1965 – December 1966 | | |
| 57 | 52 | | Martin Borchert | January 1967 – December 1968 | | |
| 58 | 53 | | Haco Boyd | January 1969 – December 1970 | | |
| 59 | 54 | | George Wimberly | January 1971 – December 1972 | | |
| 60 | 55 | | W. H. Walters | January 1973 – December 1974 | | |
| 61 | (54) | | George Wimberly (2nd term) | January 1975 – December 1976 | | |
| 62 | 56 | | Donald L. Mehlburger | January 1977 – December 1978 | | |
| 63 | 57 | | A. M. "Sandy" Keith | January 1979 – June 1979 | Resigned as mayor but remained on the City Board of Directors. | |
| 64 | 58 | | Webster Hubbell | June 1979 – July 1981 | Resigned as mayor but remained on the City Board of Directors. | |
| 65 | 59 | | Charles E. Bussey | November 1981 – December 1982 | From July – November 1981, served as Acting Mayor. First African American mayor of Little Rock. | |
| 66 | 60 | | J. W. "Buddy" Benafield | January 1983 – December 1984 | Previously had served as Mayor of England, Arkansas, in the 1970s. | |
| 67 | 61 | | Thomas A. Prince | January 1985 – December 1986 | | |
| 68 | 62 | | Lottie Shackelford | January 1987 – December 1988 | First female mayor of Little Rock. Is also the second African American mayor of Little Rock. | |
| 69 | 63 | | Floyd G. "Buddy" Villines | January 1989 – December 1990 | | |
| 70 | 64 | | Sharon Priest | January 1991 – December 1992 | Served as Arkansas Secretary of State from 1995 to 2003. | |
| 71 | 65 | | Dalton J. "Jim" Dailey Jr. | January 1993 – December 2006 | First served as mayor for two years under original city manager structure, then elected to four-year terms by a citywide election in 1994, 1998, and 2002 under the new hybrid city administrator structure. Longest-serving mayor of Little Rock (14 years). | |
| 72 | 66 | | Mark Stodola | January 2007 – December 2018 | | |
| 73 | 67 | | Frank Scott, Jr. | January 2019 – | Incumbent mayor. Little Rock's first directly elected black mayor | |

== See also ==
- List of mayors of places in Arkansas
- Timeline of Little Rock, Arkansas
