= Mark Stodola =

American politician (born 1949)

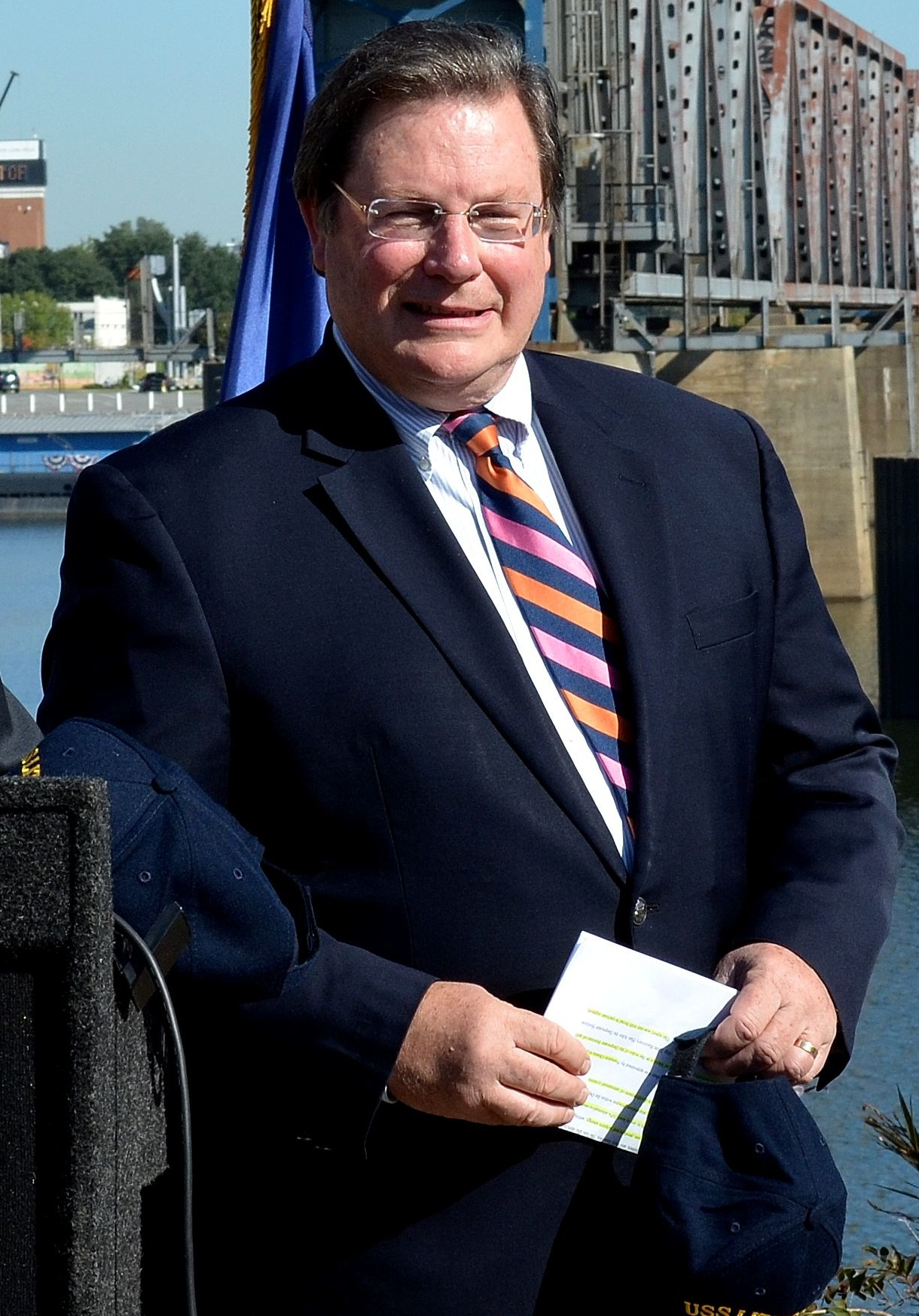

72nd Mayor of Little Rock
- In office January 3, 2007 – December 31, 2018
- Preceded by: Jim Dailey
- Succeeded by: Frank Scott Jr.

92nd President of the National League of Cities
- In office 2018
- Preceded by: Matt Zone
- Succeeded by: Karen Freeman-Wilson

Personal details
- Born: May 18, 1949 (age 77) Cedar Rapids, Iowa, U.S.
- Party: Democratic
- Spouse: Jo Ellen Stodola
- Children: 3
- Education: University of Iowa; University of Arkansas
- Profession: Attorney

Mark Stodola (born May 18, 1949) is an American politician and lawyer who previously served as the 72nd mayor of Little Rock, Arkansas from 2006 to 2018.

== Mayoralty ==
First elected in 2006, Stodola served as the mayor of Little Rock, Arkansas, from January 2007 through December 2018. Stodola won re-election to a second, four-year term in November 2010 by a landslide 84.73 percent of the vote. His re-election in 2014 was unopposed. Stodola served as president of the National League of Cities in 2018.

== Family ==
Stodola is married to his wife Jo Ellen and together they have 3 children: one daughter named Allison and twin sons named John Mark and Robert.

== Organizations ==
Stodola is currently a member of the Rotary Club in Little Rock. Stodola graduated from the Leadership Greater Little Rock, and has also served as Chair of Class 16 for the same program. He is also a member of the Heights Neighborhood Association and serves as Co-Chair of the Downtown Partnership's Main Street Task Force. Stodola has made time to serve on the Board of the Arkansas Repertory Theatre and is Past-President of the Quapaw Quarter Association and the Historic Preservation Alliance of Arkansas. Lastly, the mayor has worked with the Big Brothers Big Sisters program.
