= Frank Scott Jr. =

American politician (born 1983)

Frank Scott
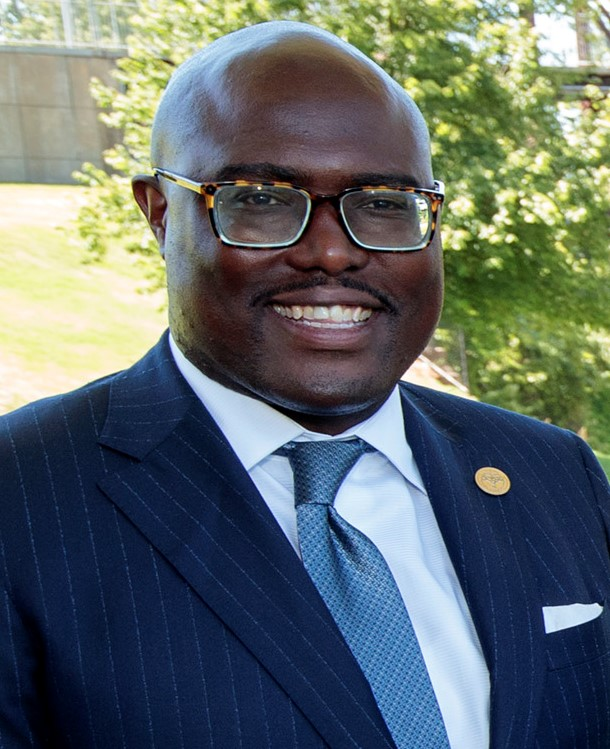

73rd Mayor of Little Rock
- Incumbent
- Assumed office January 1, 2019
- Preceded by: Mark Stodola

Personal details
- Born: November 18, 1983 (age 42) Little Rock, Arkansas, U.S.
- Party: Democratic
- Education: University of Memphis (BA); University of Arkansas, Little Rock (MBA)

Frank D. Scott Jr. (born November 18, 1983) is an American politician who has been serving as the 73rd mayor of Little Rock, Arkansas since 2019. He is a member of the Democratic Party.

== Early life and education ==
Scott is from Southwest Little Rock. He graduated from Parkview Arts and Science Magnet High School. He graduated with a bachelor's degree in business from the University of Memphis, where he became a brother of Alpha Phi Alpha fraternity, and his Master of Business Administration from the University of Arkansas at Little Rock.

== Career ==
Scott began his public service career in the office of Arkansas Governor Mike Beebe, where he served for five years, first as deputy policy director and later as director of intergovernmental affairs. Scott accepted a position as a community banker with First Security Bank, while continuing to devote significant time to serving both his city and state as a member of the Port of Little Rock Board of Directors and as a member of the Arkansas Highway Commission.

In the 2018 election, Scott ran for mayor of Little Rock. In the November 6 nonpartisan election, he led a five-candidate field with 37.11% of the vote, falling short of the 40% required to avoid a runoff election. Scott and Baker Kurrus advanced to a December 4 runoff, where Scott defeated Kurrus. Scott is the first elected African American mayor of Little Rock.

Scott was sworn in on January 1, 2019. In his first term, Scott proposed the "Rebuild the Rock" initiative, to be supported by a new sales tax to replace an expiring one. The initiative is meant to fund improvement of infrastructure and public parks, a senior center, sports complex, and upgrade technology and equipment used by first responders. The measure was defeated in a referendum in September 2021. Scott continues to push for a new sales tax and a date for a new referendum has been set for November 2024.

Scott ran for reelection in the 2022 election. He defeated local businessman Steve Landers Sr, with 50% of the vote.

On April 21, 2023, the Arkansas Ethics Commission voted 4-1 that Scott was in violation of the law for not reimbursing the city when he used his city-owned vehicle to travel to and from campaign events in his 2022 re-election campaign. Scott paid a $250 fine.

Political offices
Preceded by Mark Stodola	Mayor of Little Rock, Arkansas; 2019–present	Incumbent
