= List of jazz-influenced classical compositions =

The following is a list of jazz-influenced classical compositions. Classical music has often incorporated elements or material from popular music of the composer's time. Jazz has influenced classical music, particularly early and mid-20th-century composers, including Maurice Ravel. "While Western classical music emphasizes structure, written scores, and faithful interpretation, jazz thrives on improvisation, spontaneity, and individual expression." Classical music is "more refined and structured", "complex and intricate"; whereas jazz music is "more spontaneous and free-flowing", "upbeat and lively."

Composer	Date	Work
George Antheil	1922; 1925; 1948	Jazz Sonata, for piano A Jazz Symphony; Piano Sonata No. 4 "Jazz"
Malcolm Arnold	1954; 1959; 1974	Concerto for Harmonica and Orchestra, Op. 46; Concerto for Guitar and Orchestra, Op. 67; Concerto No. 2 for Clarinet and Orchestra, Op. 115
Larry Austin	1960; 1961; 1971	Fantasy on a Theme by Berg, for jazz orchestra: 5 saxs, 5 tpts, 4 trbns, perc set, pno, db Improvisations for Orchestra and Jazz Soloists (tpt or alt sax; perc set, db); Agape Set, for jazz orchestra: 5 saxs, 5 tpts, 4 trbns, perc set, pno, db
Milton Babbitt	1957	All Set
Leonardo Balada	2007	Caprichos No. 4 "Quasi Jazz", for solo contrabass and chamber orchestra
Bill Evans	1958; 1979	Peace Piece; We Will Meet Again
Don Banks	1962	Trio for horn, violin and piano
Leonard Bernstein	1941–42; 1944; 1948–49/1965; 1949; 1954; 1957; 1995	Sonata for Clarinet and Piano; Fancy Free; Symphony No. 2, The Age of Anxiety; Prelude, Fugue and Riffs; Serenade after Plato's "Symposium"; West Side Story; West Side Story Suite
Harrison Birtwistle	1995	Panic, for alto saxophone, jazz drum kit and orchestra
Boris Blacher	1946; 1958; 1966; 1972; 1972	Concerto for Jazz Orchestra; Die Gesänge des Seeräubers O'Rourke und seiner Geliebten Sally Brown, beide auf das Felseneiland En Vano Anhelar verschlagen, Op. 56; Plus Minus One for string quartet and jazz ensemble Blues, Espagnola und Rumba philharmonica for 12 cellos Stars and Strings, for jazz ensemble and string orchestra
Marc Blitzstein	1936–37; 1946–48	The Cradle Will Rock; Regina
Claude Bolling	1975; 1975; 1977; 1978; 1980; 1981; 1983; 1984; 1987; 1989	Suite for Flute and Jazz Piano Trio; Concerto for Guitar and Jazz Piano Trio; Suite for Violin and Jazz Piano Trio; California Suite; Picnic Suite for Guitar, Flute and Jazz Piano Trio; Toot Suite; Suite for Chamber Orchestra and Jazz Piano Trio; Suite for Cello and Jazz Piano Trio; Suite No. 2 for Flute and Jazz Piano Trio; Sonatas for Two Pianists
Aaron Copland	1920–21; 1925; 1926; 1946; 1947–48; 1949; 1961	Three Moods for piano Music for the Theater; Concerto for Piano and Orchestra; Danzón cubano Concerto for Clarinet and Orchestra; Four Piano Blues; Something Wild, film score
Valeri Ibrahimovitsj Saparov	2010	24 Jazz Preludes for piano
Claude Debussy	1905	"Reflets dans l'eau"
Andrei Eshpai	1969	Thee Prelude Jazz Melodie for Piano
Harold Farberman	1980–83	Concerto for Jazz Drummer and Orchestra
George Gershwin	1922; 1924; 1925; 1926; 1928; 1931; 1932; 1933–34; 1935; 1937	Blue Monday; Rhapsody in Blue; Concerto in F Three Preludes; An American in Paris; Second Rhapsody; Cuban Overture; Variations on "I Got Rhythm"; Porgy and Bess; Hoctor's Ballet
William Gillock	1968	Three Jazz Piano Preludes (for solo piano)
Morton Gould	1934; 1938; 1938; 1941	Chorale and Fugue in Jazz; American Symphonette No. 2 Boogie Woogie Etude (for solo piano); Boogie the Woogie (for solo piano)
Louis Gruenberg	1925; 1930; 1928	Jazzberries op.25 Jazz Masks op.30A; Six Jazz Epigrams op.30B
Hans Werner Henze	1951; 1956–57; 1968	Boulevard Solitude; Ondine; Versuch über Schweine
Paul Hindemith	1922	Suite für Klavier
Arthur Honegger	1921–22; 1924; 1929	Sonatine, for clarinet (or cello) and piano Concertino for Piano and Orchestra; Concerto for Cello and Orchestra
John Ireland	1930	Piano Concerto
James P. Johnson	1927	Yamekraw, a Negro Rhapsody
Scott Joplin	1903; 1911	A Guest of Honor; Treemonisha
Ernst Krenek	1926	Jonny spielt auf, opera
Constant Lambert	1927; 1927; 1928–29; 1930–31; 1949	Elegiac Blues; The Rio Grande; Piano Sonata; Concerto for Piano and Nine Players; Trois pièces nègres pour les touches blanches
Rolf Liebermann	1954	Concerto for Jazzband and Symphony Orchestra
Frank Martin	1940; 1956	Ballade for trombone and piano Études for string orchestra ("Pour le pizzicato")
Bohuslav Martinů	1927; 1928	La revue de cuisine Jazz Suite
Darius Milhaud	1920; 1922; 1923	Caramel Mou, Op. 68, for piano Trois rag caprices, Op. 78, for piano La création du monde
Robert Morris	1973	Not Lilacs
Robert Muczynski	1996	Desperate Measures (Paganini Variations) Op.46
Krzysztof Penderecki	1971	Actions, for free-jazz orchestra
Walter Piston	1954	Symphony No. 5
Sergei Prokofiev	1921; 1944	Piano Concerto No. 3 (2nd mvt); Symphony No. 5 (2nd mvt)
Maurice Ravel	1923–27; 1929–31; 1929–31	Sonata No. 2 for Violin and Piano; Piano Concerto for the Left Hand; Piano Concerto in G
Sergei Rachmaninoff	1926 1934	Piano Concerto No.4 Rhapsody on a Theme of Paganini
Nikolai Kapustin	1988	Twenty-Four Preludes for Piano Op.53
Erwin Schulhoff	1921; 1927; 1935	Suite for Chamber Orchestra; Violin Sonata No. 2 H.M.S. Royal Oak
Gunther Schuller	1959; 1960; 1962	Concertino for jazz quartet and orchestra Variants for jazz quartet and orchestra Journey into Jazz for jazz quintet and chamber orchestra
Mátyás Seiber	1929; 1932; 1959	Jazzolette No. 1, for 2 saxophones, trumpet, trombone, piano, bass, and drums Jazzolette No. 2, for 2 saxophones, trumpet, trombone, piano, bass, and drums Improvisations for Jazz Band and Orchestra (with John Dankworth)
John Serry Sr.	1955; 1964	American Rhapsody for solo accordion, revised for piano in 2002; Concerto for Free Bass Accordion for solo accordion, revised for piano in 2002
Dmitri Shostakovich	1927; 1934; 1938	"Tahiti Trot" (based on "Tea for Two"); Suite No. 1 for Jazz Orchestra; Suite No. 2 for Jazz Orchestra
Elie Siegmeister	1956	Clarinet Concerto
William Grant Still	1924; 1927; 1930; 1930; 1930; 1934; 1935; 1935; 1936; 1937; 1937; 1940; 1941; 1945; 1947; 1948; 1957; 1958; 1963	Darker America; La Guiablesse; Sahdji; Africa; Symphony No. 1 "Afro-American"; Blue Steel; Kaintuck; Three Visions; Troubled Island; Symphony No. 2 "Song of a New Race"; Lenox Avenue; Miss Sally's Party; A Bayou Legend; Symphony No. 5 "Western Hemisphere"; Symphony No. 4 "Autochthonous"; Miniatures; The American Scene; Symphony No. 3 "The Sunday Symphony"; Highway 1 USA
Karlheinz Stockhausen	1950; 1951; 1951; 1955–57; 1959; 1959; 1958–60; 1965; 1974–75; 1983	Drei Lieder; Sonatine for violin and piano Kreuzspiel; Gruppen; Zyklus; Refrain; Kontakte; Mikrophonie II; Tierkreis; Luzifers Tanz
Igor Stravinsky	1917–18; 1918; 1919; 1936–37/53; 1944; 1945	Ragtime for 11 instruments L'Histoire du soldat Piano-Rag-Music; Praeludium; Scherzo à la russe Ebony Concerto
Dana Suesse	1931; 1932; 1933; 1941; 1955	Jazz Nocturne; Concerto in Three Rhythms; Symphonic Waltzes; Concerto for Two Pianos and Orchestra; Jazz Concerto
Michael Tippett	1970–72	Symphony No. 3
Mark-Anthony Turnage	1993–96; 1996–2001	Blood on the Floor, for jazz quartet and large ensemble Scorched, for jazz trio and orchestra
William Walton	1922; 1925	Façade; Portsmouth Point (overture)
Kurt Weill	1928	The Threepenny Opera
Earl Wild	1973	Virtuoso Etudes after Gershwin
Alec Wilder	1939–41	Octets
Stefan Wolpe	1950	Quartet for trumpet, tenor saxophone, percussion, and piano
Bernd Alois Zimmermann	1954; 1967	Trumpet Concerto: "Nobody knows de trouble I see" for trumpet in C and jazz orchestra Die Befristeten for jazz quintet
