= William Grant Still =

American composer (1895–1978)

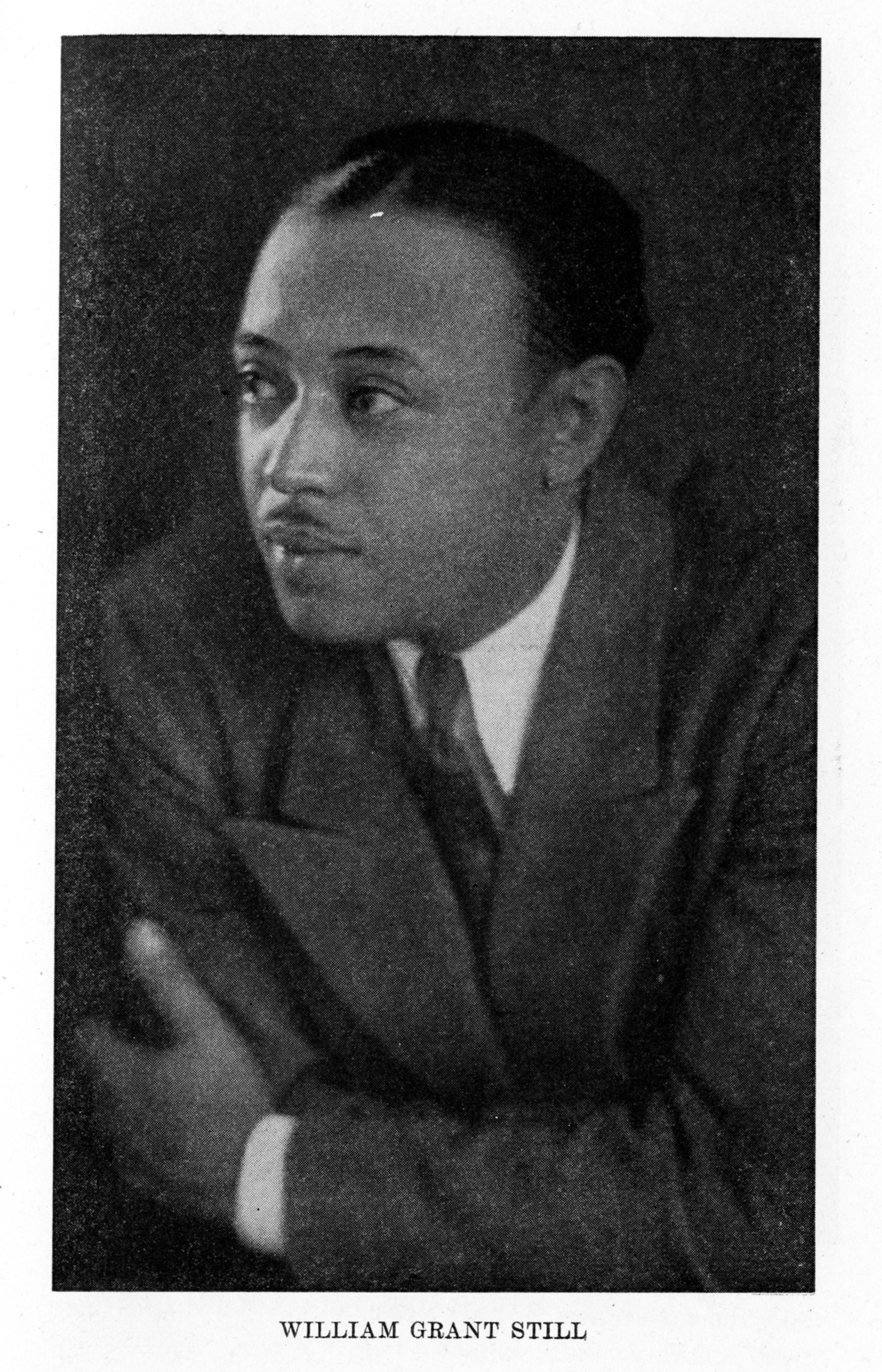
- Portrait by Maud Cuney Hare, 1936
- Born: William Grant Still Jr. May 11, 1895; Woodville, Mississippi, U.S.
- Died: December 3, 1978 (aged 83); Los Angeles, California, U.S.
- Education: M. W. Gibbs High School; Wilberforce University; Oberlin Conservatory of Music
- Occupations: Composer; conductor
- Spouses: Grace Bundy (m. 1915; div. 1939); Verna Arvey (m. 1939)
- Children: 6
- Relatives: Celeste Headlee (granddaughter)

Signature
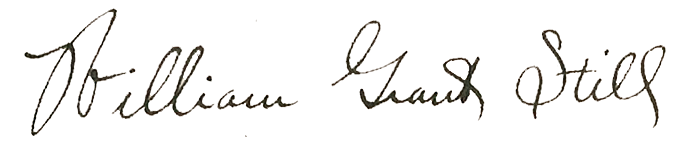

William Grant Still Jr. (May 11, 1895 – December 3, 1978) was an American composer of nearly two hundred works, including five symphonies, four ballets, nine operas, and more than thirty choral works, art songs, chamber music, and solo works. Born in Mississippi and raised in Little Rock, Arkansas, Still attended Wilberforce University and Oberlin Conservatory of Music as a student of George Whitefield Chadwick and then as a student of Edgard Varèse. Because of his close association and collaboration with prominent African-American literary and cultural figures, Still is considered to be part of the Harlem Renaissance.

Still was the first American composer to have an opera produced by the New York City Opera. He is known primarily for his first symphony, Afro-American Symphony (1930), which, until 1950, was the most widely performed symphony composed by an American. Still often is referred to as the "Dean of Afro-American Composers". He was able to become a leading figure in the field of American classical music as the first African-American to conduct a major American symphony orchestra, have a symphony performed by a leading orchestra, have an opera performed by a major opera company, and have an opera performed on national television. The papers of Still and his second wife, the librettist and writer Verna Arvey, are currently held by the University of Arkansas.

== Life ==
William Grant Still Jr. was born on May 11, 1895, in Woodville, Mississippi. He was the son of two teachers, Carrie Lena Fambro Still Shepperson (1872–1927) and William Grant Still Sr. (1871–1895). His father was a partner in a grocery store and performed as a local bandleader. William Grant Still Sr. died when his infant son was three months old.

Still's mother and he moved to Little Rock, Arkansas, where she taught high school English. In 1904, She met and married Charles B. Shepperson, who nurtured the musical interests of his stepson William by taking him to operettas and buying Red Seal recordings of classical music that the boy greatly enjoyed. The two also attended a number of performances by musicians on tour. His maternal grandmother, Anne Fambro, sang African-American spirituals to him.

Still showed a great interest in music and started violin lessons in Little Rock at the age of 15. He taught himself to play the clarinet, saxophone, oboe, double bass, cello, and viola. At 16 years old, he was graduated as class valedictorian from M. W. Gibbs High School in Little Rock in 1911.

His mother wanted him to go to medical school, so Still pursued a bachelor of science degree program at Wilberforce University, a historically Black college in Ohio. Still became a member of Kappa Alpha Psi fraternity. He conducted the university band, learned to play various instruments, and started to compose and to perform orchestrations. He left Wilberforce without graduation.

Using a small amount of money left to him by his father, he began studying at the Oberlin Conservatory of Music. Still worked for the school assisting the janitor and at a few small jobs outside of the school, but struggled financially. When Professor Lehmann asked him why he wasn't studying composition, Still replied that he simply couldn't afford to. When this became known, George Whitfield Andrews taught composition to Still, without charge. He also was able to study privately with the modern French composer Edgard Varèse and the American composer George Whitefield Chadwick.

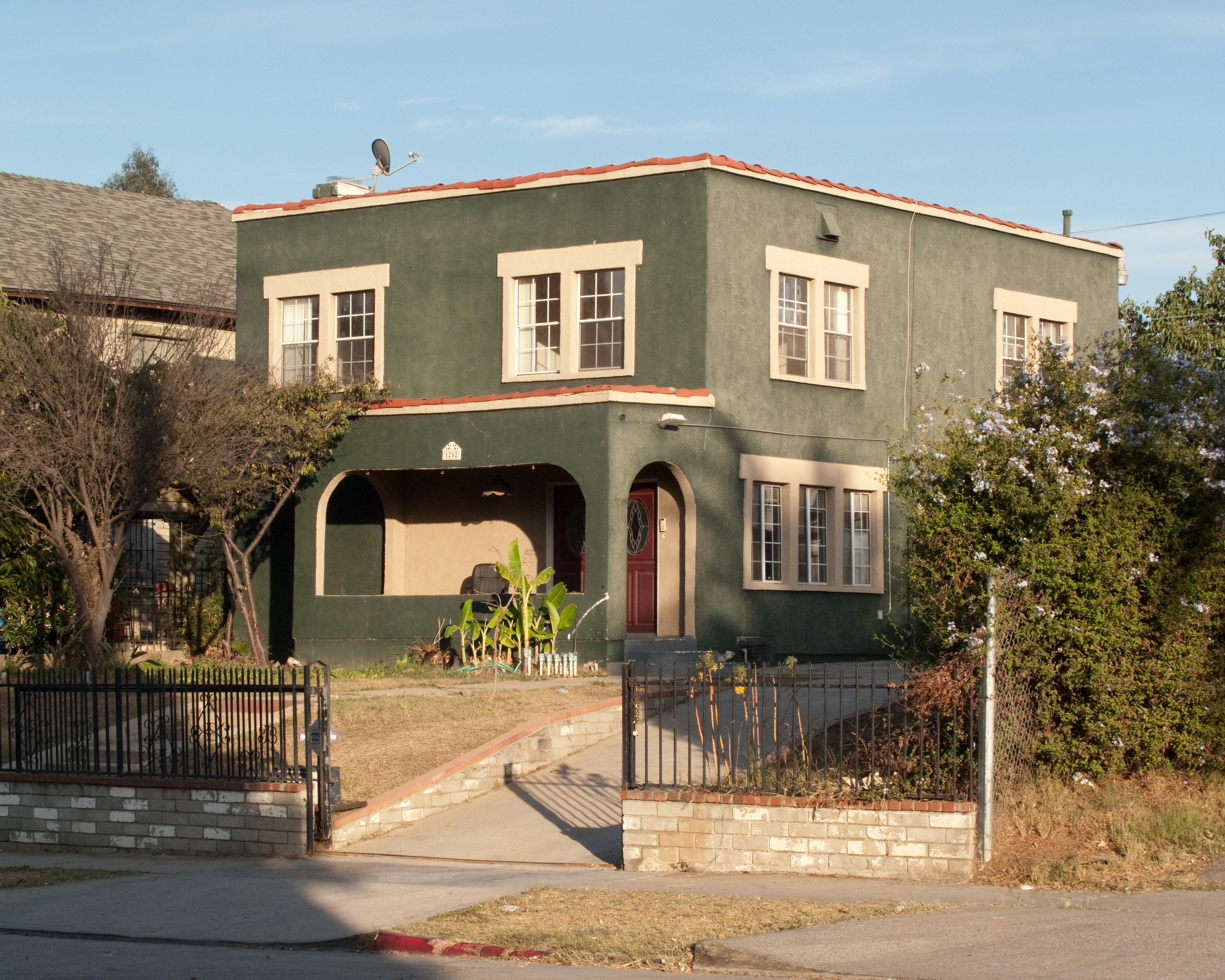
William Grant Still Residence, 2012 1262 S. Victoria Avenue, Los Angeles, California

On October 4, 1915, Still married Grace Bundy, whom he had met while they were both at Wilberforce. They had a son, William III, and three daughters, Gail, June, and Caroline. They separated in 1932 and divorced February 6, 1939.

Still had moved to Los Angeles after receiving his first fellowship in 1934.

On February 8, 1939, he married pianist Verna Arvey. They drove to Tijuana for the ceremony because at the time, 'interracial' marriage was illegal in California. They had two children, a daughter, Judith Anne, and a son, Duncan. Celeste Headlee, a broadcast journalist, an author, a classically trained soprano, and daughter to Judith Anne, is Still's granddaughter.

On December 1, 1976, Still's home at 1262 Victoria Avenue in Oxford Square, Los Angeles was designated as Los Angeles Historic-Cultural Monument #169.

He died in Los Angeles in 1978.

== Career ==
In 1916, Still worked in Memphis for W.C. Handy's band. He then joined the United States Navy to serve in World War I in 1918, and eventually moved to Harlem after the war, where he continued to work for Handy. During this time, Still was involved with many cultural figures of the Harlem Renaissance including the likes of Langston Hughes, Alain Locke, Arna Bontemps, and Countee Cullen.

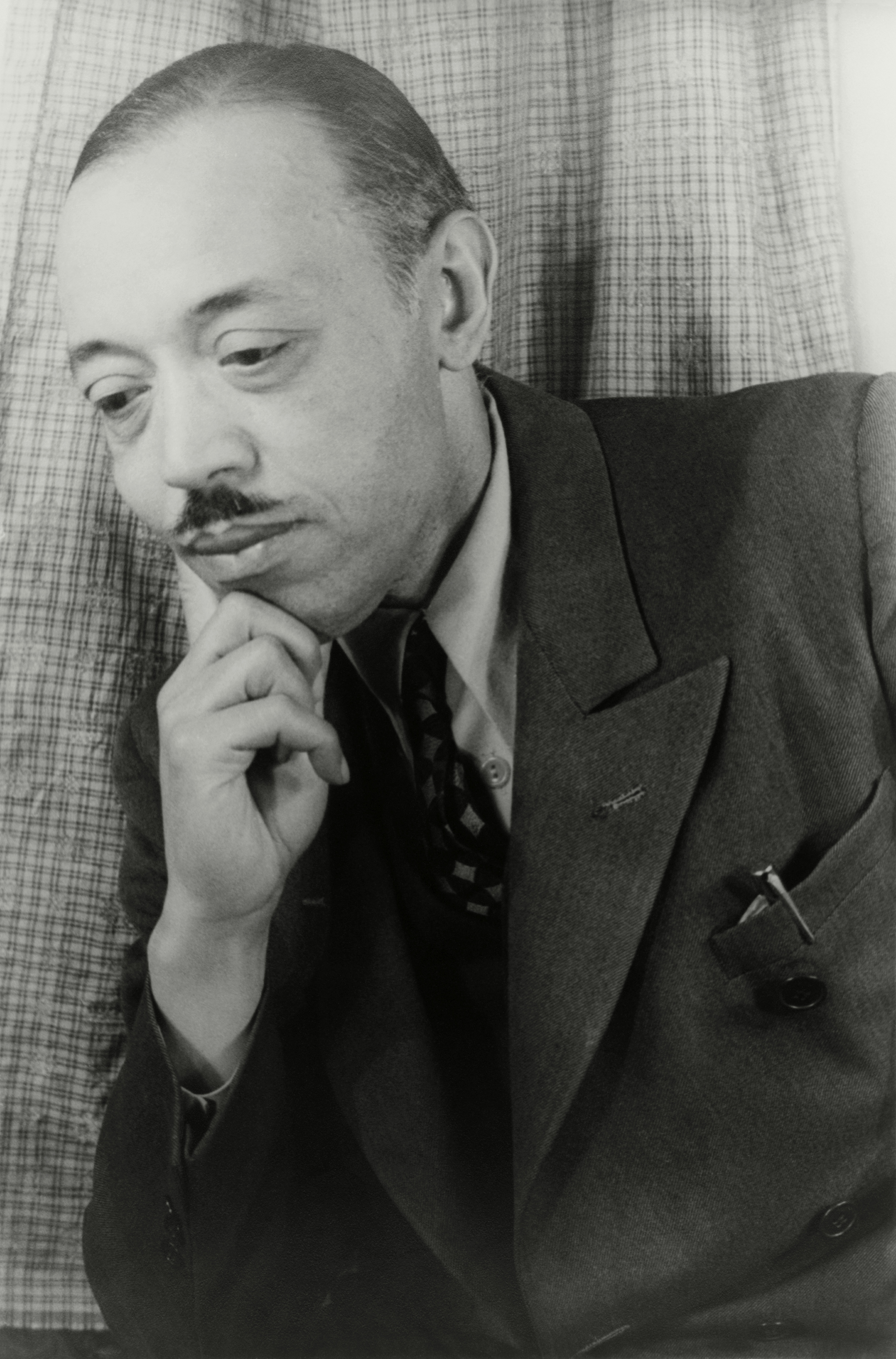
William Grant Still 1949 portrait by Carl Van Vechten

He recorded with Fletcher Henderson's Dance Orchestra in 1921, and later played in the pit orchestra for Noble Sissle and Eubie Blake's musical, Shuffle Along and another pit with Sophie Tucker, Artie Shaw, and Paul Whiteman. Under Henderson, he joined Henry Pace's Pace Phonograph Company, known as Black Swan Records. Later in the 1920s, Still served as the arranger of Yamekraw, a "Negro Rhapsody", composed by the Harlem stride pianist, James P. Johnson.

In the 1930s, Still worked as an arranger of popular music, composing works for popular NBC Radio broadcasts such as Willard Robison's Deep River Hour and Paul Whiteman's Old Gold Show.

Still's first major orchestral composition, Symphony No. 1 "Afro-American", was performed in 1931 by the Rochester Philharmonic, conducted by Howard Hanson. It was the first time the complete score of a work by an African American was performed by a major orchestra. By the end of World War II, the piece had been performed in orchestras located in New York, Chicago, Los Angeles, Berlin, Paris, and London. The symphony was arguably the most popular of any composed by an American to that time. As a result of his close professional relationship with Hanson, many of Still's compositions were performed for the first time in Rochester.

In 1934, Still moved to Los Angeles after receiving his first Guggenheim Fellowship, allowing him to start work on the first of his nine operas, Blue Steel. Two years later, Still conducted the Los Angeles Philharmonic Orchestra at the Hollywood Bowl, the first African American to conduct a major American orchestra in a performance of his own works.

Still arranged music for films such as Pennies from Heaven, starring Bing Crosby and Madge Evans, and Lost Horizon, starring Ronald Colman, Jane Wyatt, and Sam Jaffe. For the latter, he arranged the music of Dimitri Tiomkin. Still was also hired to arrange music for the 1943 film Stormy Weather, but left because "Twentieth-Century Fox 'degraded colored people.'"

For the 1939 New York World's Fair, Still composed Song of a City for the exhibit "Democracity," which played continuously during the fair's run. Despite writing music for the fair, he was unable to attend the fair without police protection except on "Negro Day".

A decade after its original composition, his opera Troubled Island about Jean-Jacques Dessalines and Haiti, was performed in 1949 by the New York City Opera. It is the first opera by an American to be performed by the company. It also is the first opera by an African American to be performed by a major company. Still was, however, upset by the negative reviews it received.

Still's works were performed internationally by the Berlin Philharmonic Orchestra, the London Symphony Orchestra, the Tokyo Philharmonic Orchestra, and the BBC Orchestra.

Still was the first African American to conduct a major orchestra in the Deep South, doing so in 1955, where he conducted the New Orleans Philharmonic Orchestra.

He died in Los Angeles in 1978. Three years after his death, A Bayou Legend became the first opera by an African-American composer to be performed on national television.

== Legacy and honors ==
- Still received three Guggenheim Fellowships in music composition (1934, 1935, 1938), at least one Rosenwald Fellowship, and a Mu Phi Epsilon Citation of Merit.
- In 1949, he received a citation for Outstanding Service to American Music from the National Association for American Composers and Conductors
- In 1976, his home in Los Angeles was designated a Historic-Cultural Monument.
- In 1977, the William Grant Still Arts Center opened in his honor.
- He was awarded honorary doctorates from Oberlin College, Wilberforce University, Howard University, Bates College, the University of Arkansas, Pepperdine University, the New England Conservatory of Music, the Peabody Conservatory in Baltimore, and the University of Southern California.
- He was posthumously awarded the 1982 Mississippi Institute of Arts and Letters award for music composition for his opera A Bayou Legend.

== Selected compositions ==
Still composed almost 200 works, including nine operas, five symphonies, four ballets, plus art songs, chamber music, and works for solo instruments. He composed more than thirty choral works. Many of his works are believed to be lost.

- Saint Louis Blues (comp.W. C. Handy; arr. Still; 1916)
- Hesitating Blues (comp.W. C. Handy; arr. Still; 1916)
- From the Land of Dreams (1924)
- Darker America (1924)
- From the Journal of a Wanderer (1925)
- Levee Land (1925)
- From The Black Belt (1926)
- La Guiablesse (1927)
- Yamekraw, a Negro Rhapsody (comp. James P. Johnson; arr. Still; 1928)
- Sahdji (1930)
- Africa (1930)
- Symphony No. 1 "Afro-American" (1930, revised in 1969)
- A Deserted Plantation (1933)
- The Sorcerer (1933)
- Dismal Swamp (1933)
- Blue Steel (1934)
- Kaintuck' (1935)
- Three Visions (1935)
- Summerland (1935)
- A Song A Dust (1936)
- Symphony No. 2, "Song of A New Race" (1937)
- Lenox Avenue (1937)
- Song of A City (1938)
- Seven Traceries (1939)
- And They Lynched Him on A Tree (1940)
- Miss Sally's Party (1940)
- Can'tcha line 'em, for orchestra (1940)
- Old California (1941)
- Troubled Island, opera, produced 1949 (1937–39)
- A Bayou Legend, opera (1941)
- Plain-Chant for America (1941)
- Incantation and Dance (1941)
- A Southern Interlude (1942)
- In Memoriam: The Colored Soldiers Who Died for Democracy (1943)
- Suite for Violin & Piano (1943)
- Festival Overture (1944)
- Poem for Orchestra (1944)
- Bells (1944)
- Symphony No. 5, "Western Hemisphere" (1945, revised 1970)
- From The Delta (1945)
- Wailing Woman (1946)
- Archaic Ritual Suite (1946)
- Symphony No. 4, "Autochthonous" (1947)
- Danzas de Panama (1948)
- From A Lost Continent (1948)
- Wood Notes (1948)
- Miniatures (1948)
- Songs of Separation (©1949)
- Constaso (1950)
- To You, America (1951)
- Grief, originally titled as Weeping Angel (1953)

 Berg, G. (2022). Shall We Gather. Journal of Singing, 79(1), 128–129.: 128–129 
 Berg, G. (2022). Shall We Gather. Journal of Singing, 79(1), 128–129.

- Rhapsody (1954)
- The American Scene (1957)
- Serenade (1957)
- Ennanga (1958)
- Symphony No. 3, "The Sunday Symphony" (1958)
- Lyric Quartette (1960)
- Patterns (1960)
- The Peaceful Land (1960)
- Preludes (1962)
- Highway 1, USA (1962)
- Folk Suite No. 4 (1963)
- Threnody: In Memory of Jan Sibelius (1965)
- Little Red School House (1967)
- Little Folk Suite (1968)
- Choreographic Prelude (1970)

== See also ==
- Black conductors
- List of African-American composers
  - William L. Dawson
  - W. C. Handy
  - James P. Johnson
  - Florence Price
- List of jazz-influenced classical compositions
- Samuel Coleridge-Taylor, early Black British composer

== Sources ==
- Horne, Aaron. Woodwind Music of Black Composers, Greenwood Press, 1990. ISBN 0-313272-65-4
- Roach, Hildred. Black American Music. Past and Present, second edition, Krieger Publishing Company 1992. ISBN 0-894647-66-0
- Sadie, Stanley; Hitchcock, H. Wiley. The New Grove Dictionary of American Music, Grove's Dictionaries of Music, 1986. ISBN 0-943818-36-2
