= Chicago Ballet =

Chicago dance company

Chicago Opera Ballet

General information
- Name: Chicago Opera Ballet
- Year founded: 1956

Chicago Opera Ballet was a Chicago dance company located in downtown Chicago, Illinois.

== History ==
Founded in 1956, it is a Chicago dance company located in downtown Chicago. Chicago Grand Opera Company's first ballet master was Luigi Albertieri (protégé of Enrico Cecchetti). The opera became a base from which successful Chicago resident dance companies emerged. In 1922, two émigré dancers, Andreas Pavley and Serge Oukrainsky, among the opera's most illustrious early ballet masters, created Chicago's first independent ballet company, the Pavley-Oukrainsky Ballet, which toured nationally and internationally until Pavley died in 1931.

In 1919, Adolph Bolm was invited by the opera to stage an original ballet. Based on a story by Oscar Wilde, Bolm's The Birthday of the Infanta had music by Chicago composer John Alden Carpenter and decor by the American designer Robert Edmond Jones. Midwest dancer Ruth Page initially starred as the Infanta. In a later presentation of this ballet a young Chicago ballerina, Betty Felsen, starred as the Infanta. Born in 1905, Betty became a principal dancer before she was twenty years old. When Pavley and Oukrainsky left the opera in 1922 to form their company, Betty joined their new company and Bolm became the Chicago Opera's ballet master. Subsequently, he helped establish Chicago's Allied Arts, considered the first ballet theater in the United States, which he directed from 1924 to 1927. Allied Arts ceased for lack of funds, but the Adolph Bolm Ballet continued. Experimentation continued in the 1930s and included a pioneering attempt by Mark Turbyfill (Chicago Opera) and his former student Katherine Dunham to organize an African American ballet company in Chicago. In 1933, Ruth Page choreographed La Guiablesse, which featured Page along with Dunham and an all-black supporting cast. Dunham, Ruth Page and Bentley Stone formed the Chicago Works Progress Administration (WPA) Dance Project and had significant success. Two important ballets emerged by Page and Stone; American Patterns (1937), the first feminist ballet, and the landmark Frankie & Johnnie.

Following the WPA, The Page-Stone Ballet was the first American ballet company to tour South America. Ruth Page became the leading force of ballet in Chicago, establishing many Chicago companies with various names: Chicago Grand Opera Company, Ravinia Opera Festival, the Lyric Opera of Chicago, Chicago Opera Ballet, Ruth Page's International Ballet and Chicago Ballet, with Ben Stevenson and Larry Long as co-artistic directors in 1974. Chicago Ballet was well known for Page's version of The Nutcracker at Chicago's Arie Crown Theater in McCormick Place. It premiered in 1965 and continued until 1997. Many international ballet stars appeared with the company during the long Nutcracker seasons.

== Historical notes ==
- The San Francisco Ballet is often called the first ballet company in America, probably because it never changed its name. The San Francisco Ballet was founded in 1933 as part of San Francisco Opera, while Chicago Ballet (with various names) was established in 1910 as part of Chicago Grand Opera Company.

== See also ==
- Joffrey Ballet – another Chicago ballet company founded in 1956
