= Lenox Avenue =

North-south avenue in Manhattan, New York

- Malcolm X Boulevard
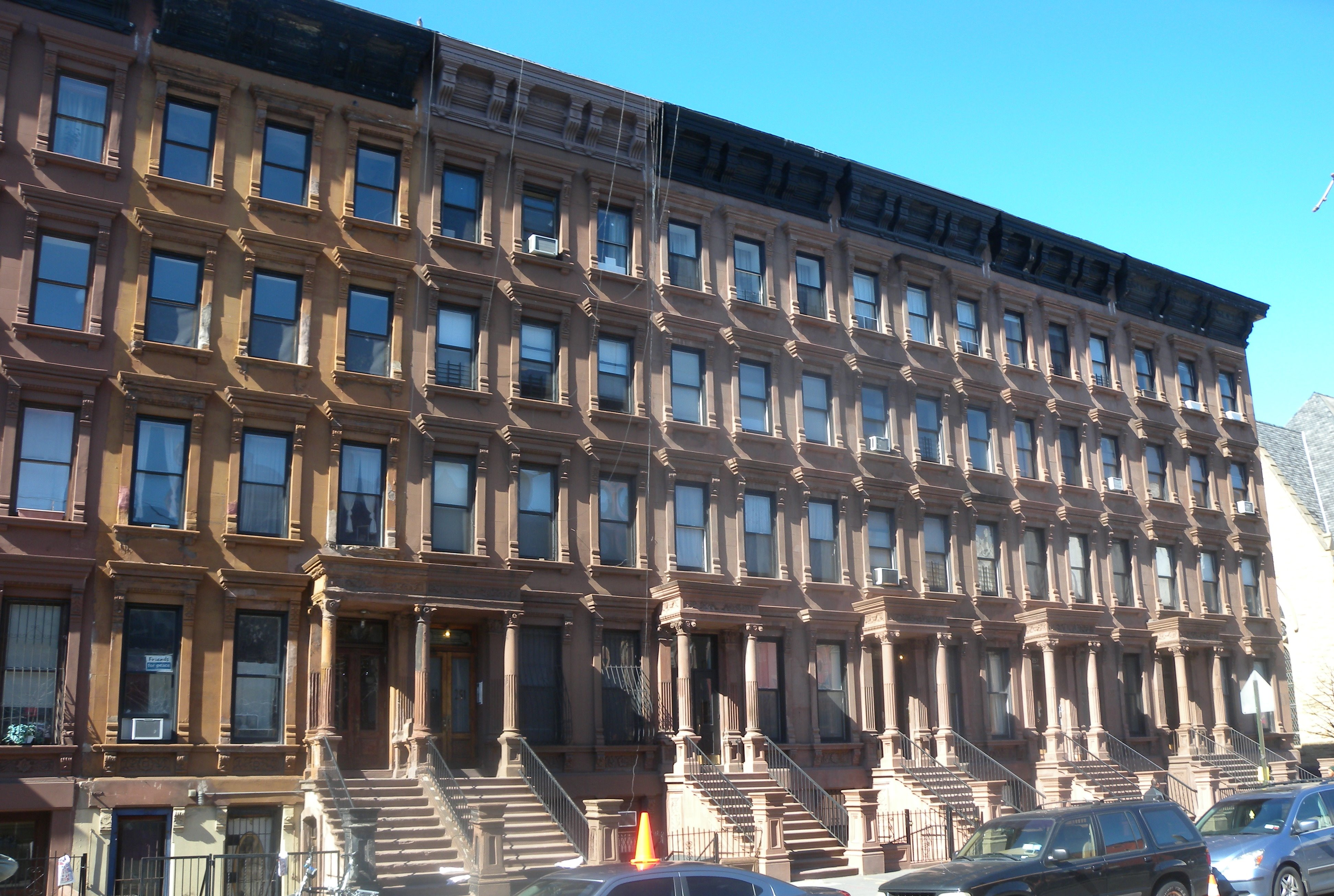
- Row houses on Lenox Avenue between 122nd and 123rd Streets are part of the Mount Morris Park Historic District
- Former name: Sixth Avenue
- Part of: Sixth Avenue
- Namesake: James Lenox and Malcolm X
- Owner: City of New York
- Maintained by: NYCDOT
- Length: 1.9 mi (3.1 km)
- Location: Manhattan, New York City
- South end: Central Park North (110th Street) / East Drive in Harlem
- Major junctions: 145th Street Bridge in Harlem
- North end: 147th Street in Harlem
- East: Fifth Avenue
- West: Adam Clayton Powell Jr. Boulevard

Construction
- Commissioned: March 1811

Lenox Avenue or Malcolm X Boulevard (both names are officially recognized) is the primary north–south route through Harlem in the upper portion of Manhattan in New York City, New York, United States. The two-way street runs from Farmers' Gate at Central Park North (110th Street) to 147th Street. Its traffic is figuratively described as "Harlem's heartbeat" by Langston Hughes in his poem Juke Box Love Song.

From 119th Street to 123rd Street, Lenox Avenue is part of the Mount Morris Park Historic District, designated by the New York City Landmarks Preservation Commission in 1971.

== History ==
Originally a part of Sixth Avenue, the segment north of Central Park was renamed in late 1887 for philanthropist James Lenox. In 1987, it was co-named Malcolm X Boulevard, in honor of the slain civil rights leader.

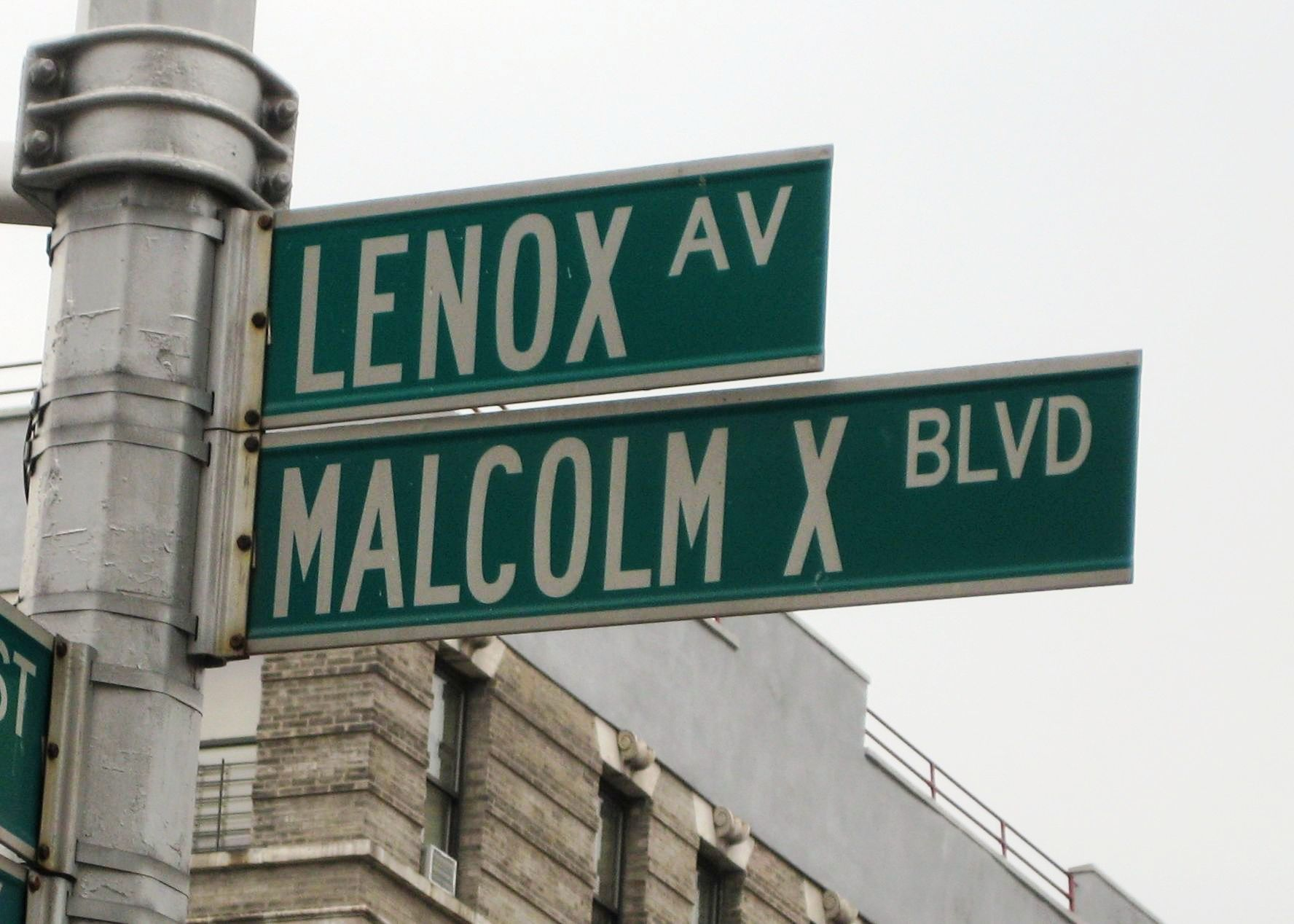
Co-signing of Lenox Avenue and Malcolm X Boulevard

The avenue was the heart of Harlem during the Harlem Renaissance in the 1930s. The street brought together African Americans, Latinos, British West Indians, and Spaniards who developed relationships over common interests such as jazz and food. In 1932, Harlem was so firmly established as the world capital of jazz and African-American culture in general that "black cinema" films like Harlem Is Heaven were playing on the nation's big screens. Jazz flourished and grew like it could have in no other time and place. "You might have had 15 great clubs on one block, all going at once," said the trombonist and bandleader Wycliffe Gordon. "Imagine going into a joint to check out Willie 'The Lion' Smith, and sitting next to you are Duke Ellington and James P. Johnson." Lenox Avenue is thought by some to be one of the most important streets in the world for African American culture.

The Savoy Ballroom was located between 140th and 141st Streets on Lenox Avenue. Other historical venues of Lenox Avenue are Sylvia's Restaurant, located between 126th and 127th; and the Lenox Lounge, located between 124th and 125th.

== Transportation ==
The IRT Lenox Avenue Line runs under the entire length of the street, serving the New York City Subway's 2 and 3 trains. The M7 and M102 serve Lenox north of West 116th Street, respectively coming from west and east, and the M1 joins in north of West 139th Street. All three run to West 147th Street (Harlem) or from West 146th Street (opposite terminals).

== In popular culture ==
- Lenox Avenue – 1937 composition and 1938 ballet by William Grant Still
- The corner of Lenox Avenue and 125th Street is mentioned in the song "When the Revolution Comes" by The Last Poets on their self-titled album (1970).
- Small Talk at 125th and Lenox (1970) is an album by Gil Scott-Heron.
- Lenox Avenue Breakdown is an album by jazz alto saxophonist Arthur Blythe. Columbia Records released the album in 1979.
- In The Fire Next Time, James Baldwin refers to Lenox Avenue simply as "The Avenue".
- The main characters of the 1992 novel Jazz by Toni Morrison live on Lenox Avenue.
- The video for Madonna's 1994 single "Secret" was shot on Lenox Avenue.
- "Lenox Avenue: Midnight", a well-known poem by Langston Hughes, is set on Lenox Avenue, as is his "The Weary Blues". The avenue is mentioned in his "Juke Box Love Song" and "Consider Me".
- The avenue is featured in the first verse of the original Irving Berlin lyrics of "Puttin' On the Ritz". The song refers to the then-popular fad of poor but flashily dressed black Harlemites parading up and down Lenox Avenue, "Spending ev'ry dime / For a wonderful time".
- In the title track of his debut record Lifestylez ov da Poor & Dangerous, Big L raps about 139th Street and Lenox Avenue.
- The street signs are heavily featured in the opening titles of the 2016 Netflix series Luke Cage, which takes place and was filmed in Harlem.
- Part of Teyana Taylor's 2018 music video for the remix of "Gonna Love Me" was shot on Lenox Avenue, near a mural of Big L.
- The last line of the "Strut Miss Lizzie" patter has "...get set for Lenox Avenue."
- In the 1995 movie Die Hard with a Vengeance, Simon Peter Gruber initially requires Lieutenant John McClane to get to the corner of Amsterdan Avenue and the 138th Street but later we see him in Lenox Avenue and the same street, where he is quickly meeting with buddy Zeus (played by Samuel L. Jackson), although the scene was actually shot in Audubon Avenue, close to West 175th Street (Washington Heights, Manhattan)

== Gallery ==
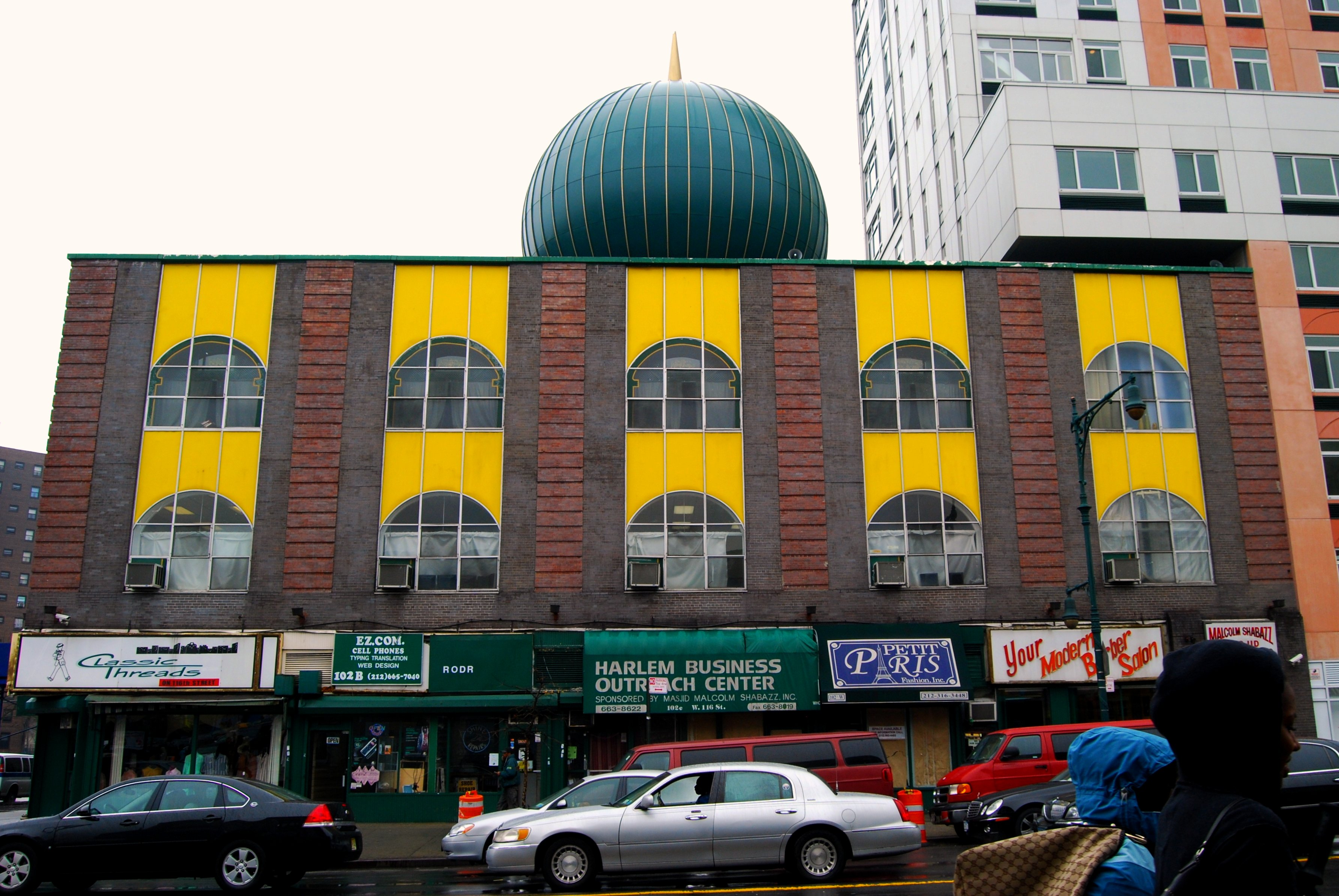
Mosque No. 7 at 116th Street

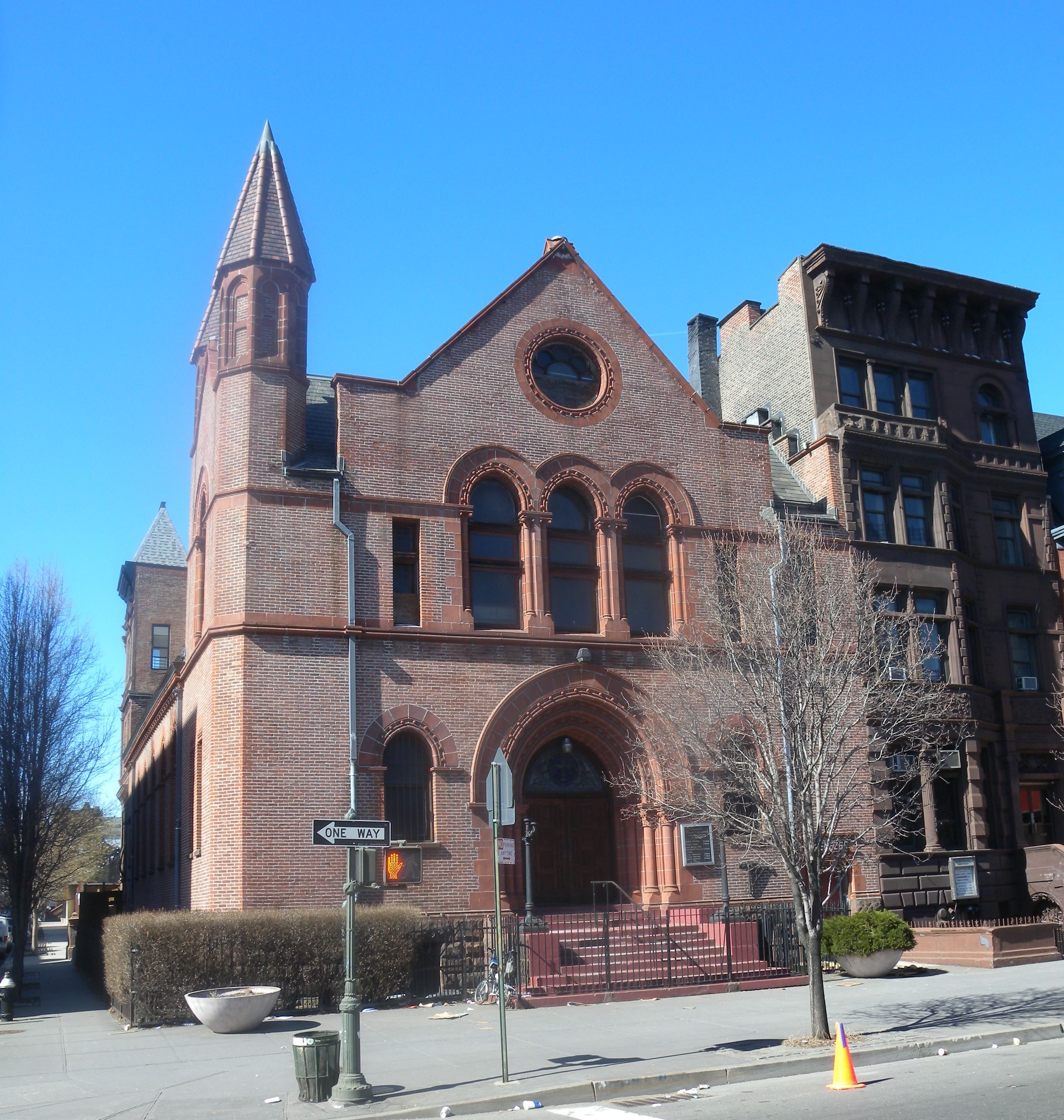
The Ebenezer Gospel Tabernacle at 121st Street, formerly the Lenox Avenue Unitarian Church (1889)

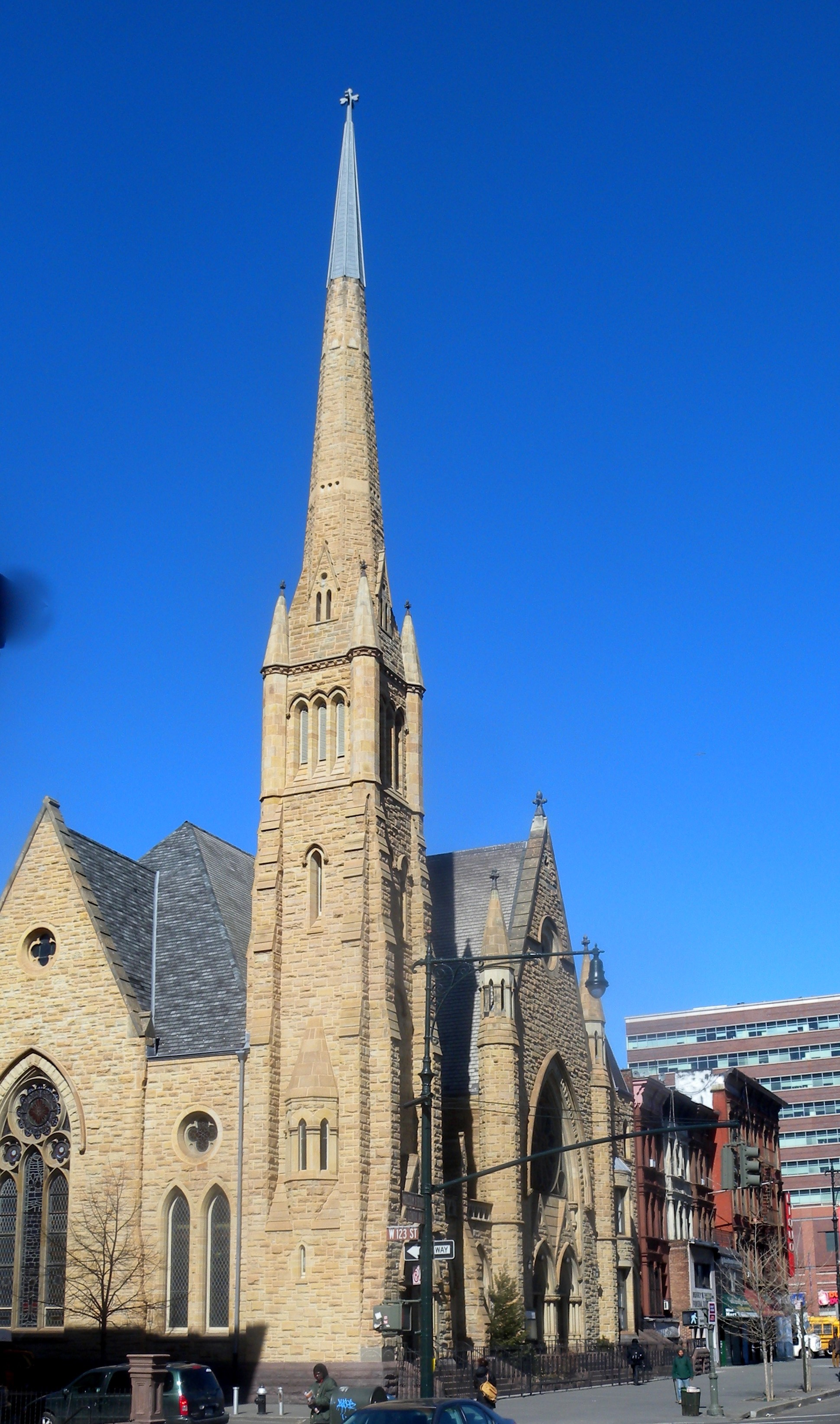
Ephesus Seventh-Day Adventist Church at 123rd Street, formerly the Second Collegiate Church of Harlem (1887)

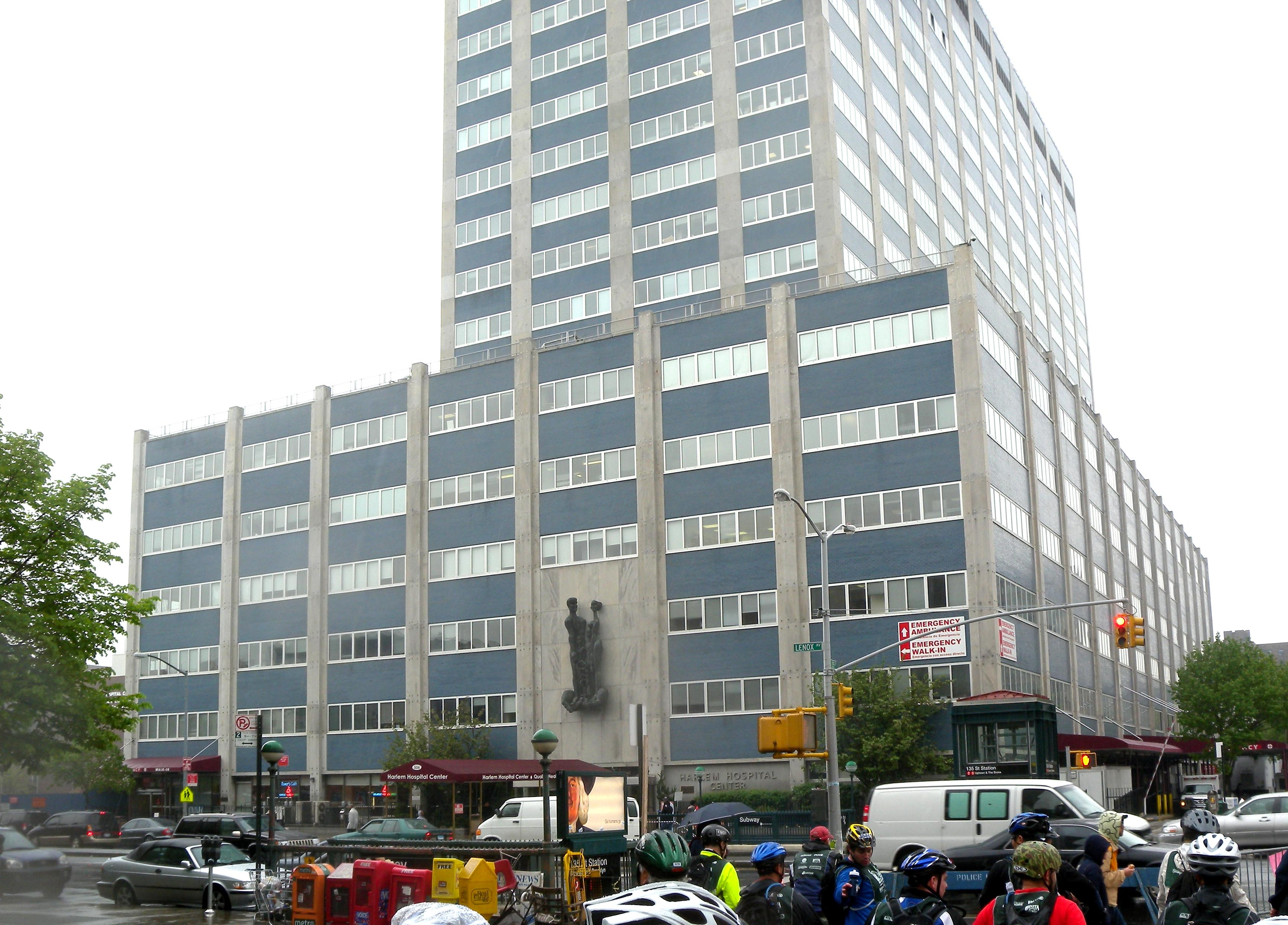
Harlem Hospital at 135th Street

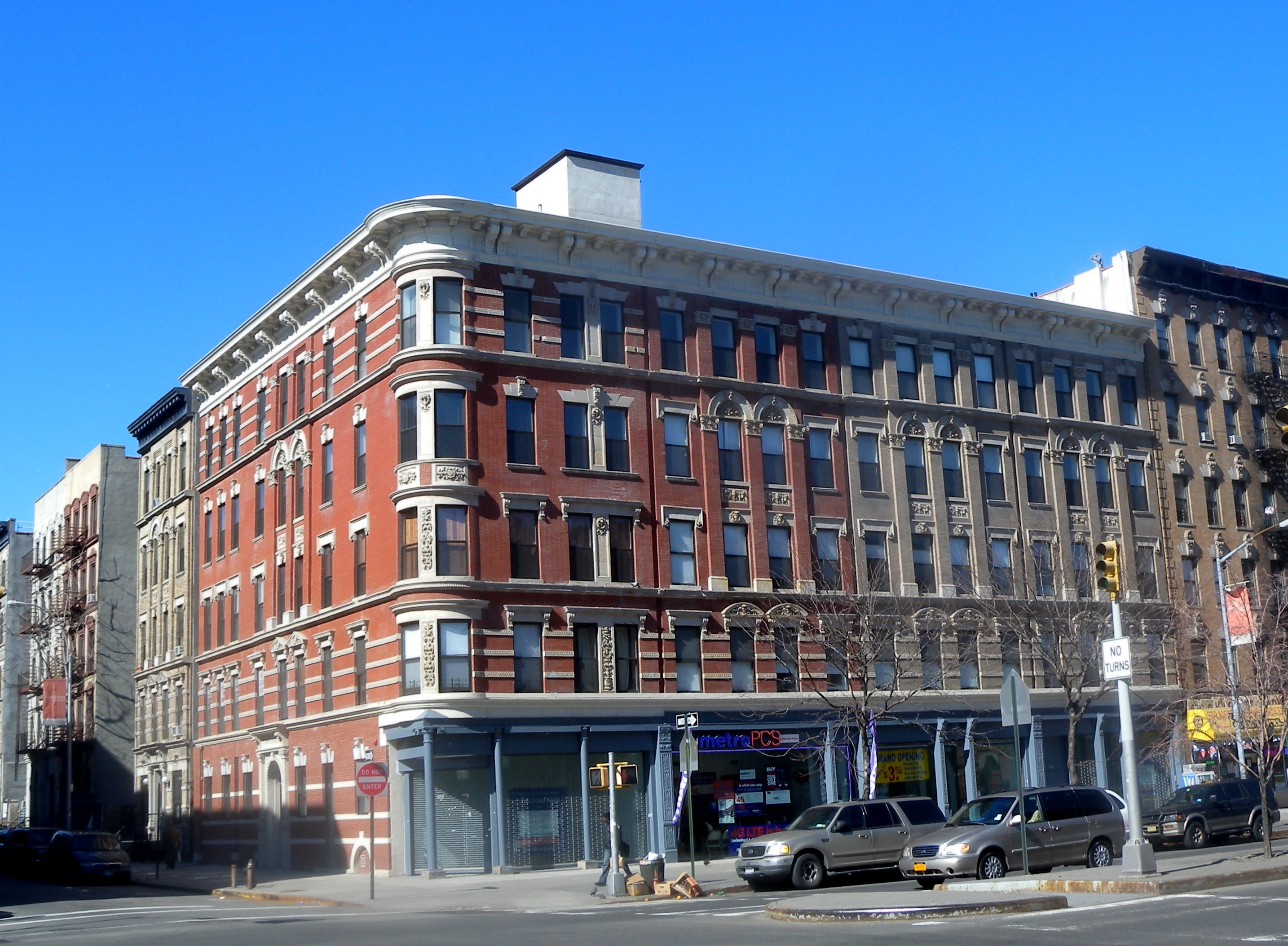
The Savoy West at 138th Street

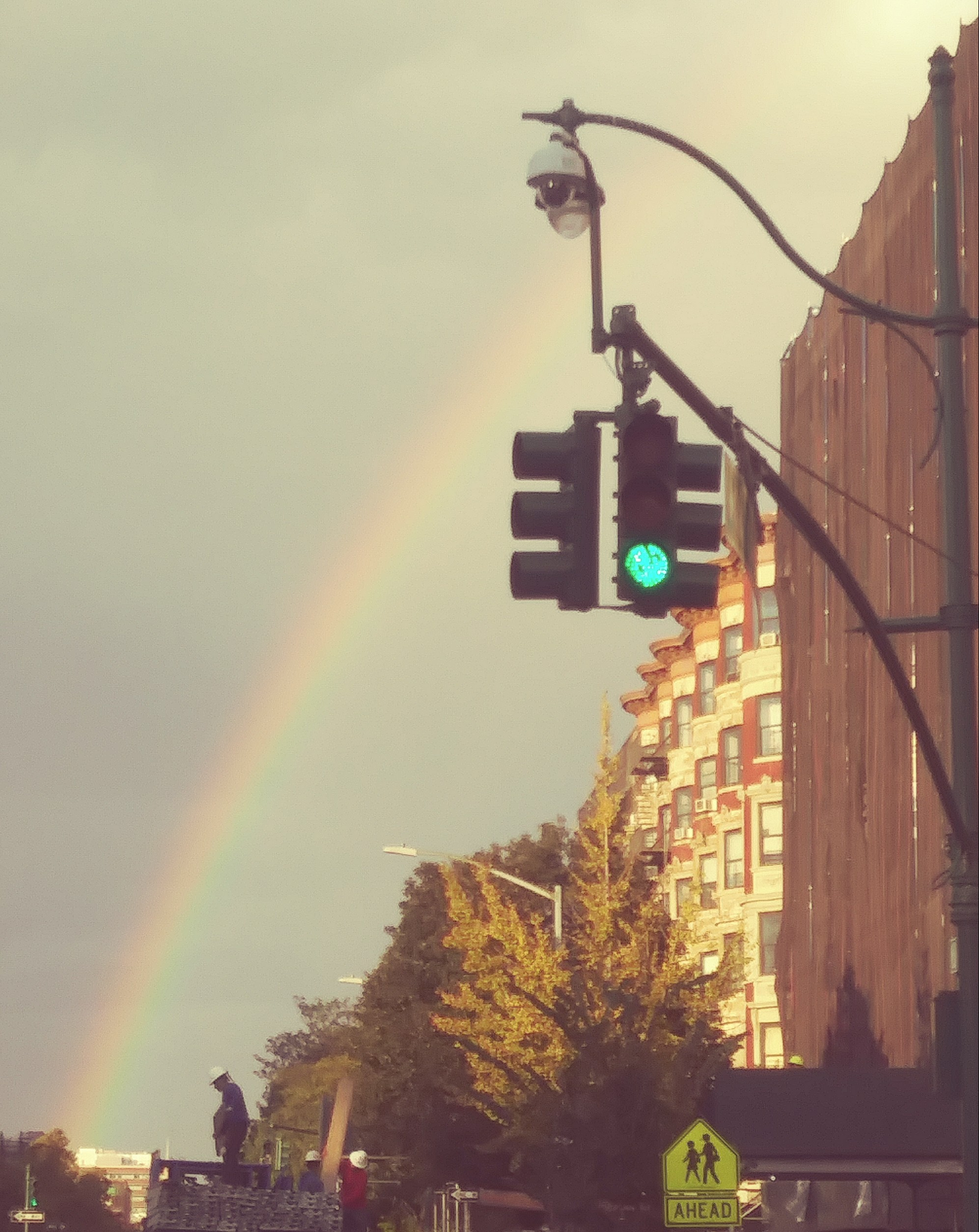
Rainbow over Malcolm X Boulevard, in a view looking northward from Central Park North
