= Highway 1, USA (Still) =

1962 opera by William Grant Still

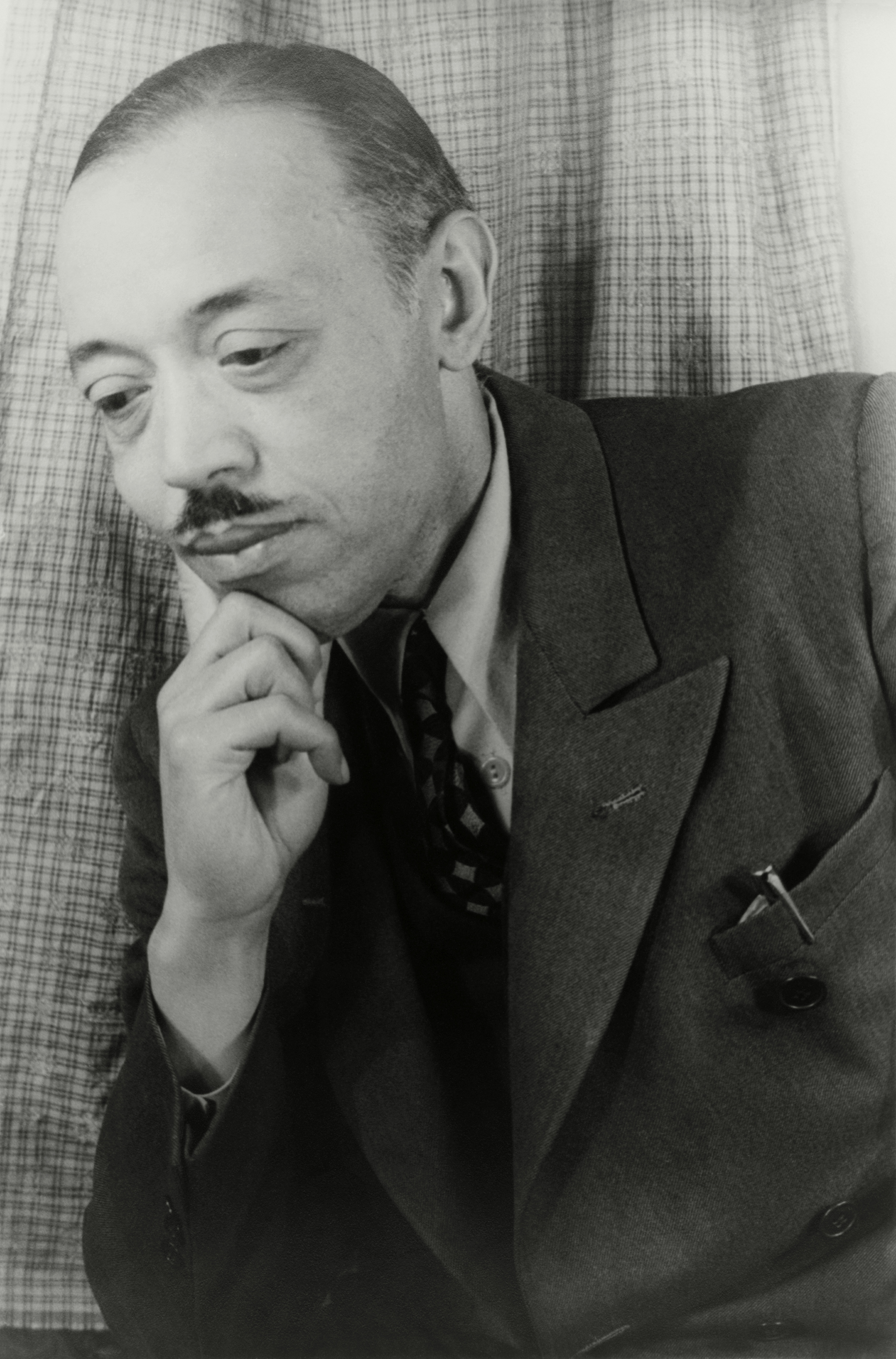
William Grant Still in 1949, photographed by Carl Van Vechten

Highway 1, USA is an American opera in one act with music by William Grant Still and libretto by Verna Arvey. Originally composed during the 1940s with the title A Southern Interlude, the opera received its premiere under its revised and definitive title in 1963.

== History ==
Working from an original libretto by Arvey, Still began to compose the music for the opera in 1941, under the title A Southern Interlude. He entered the work into several composition competitions in 1946 and 1959, without success, and also in 1954 to the New York City-based company Punch Opera, again without success. In 1961, during a visit to the University of Miami for a concert of the university's 'Festival of American Music' that featured one of his works, Still and university faculty member and conductor Fabien Sevitzky discussed the possibility of a future festival production of one of Still's operas. Still subsequently revised the opera into its final form, in one act divided into two scenes, with the new title Highway 1, USA.

The opera received its premiere at Coral Gables High School on 11 May 1963, Still's 68th birthday, under the auspices of that year's 'Festival of American Music' of the University of Miami, to a favourable reception. Subsequent performances have included a 1972 staging by Opera/South in Jackson, Mississippi, the first professional production of the opera, and a 1977 production by Opera Ebony at the Beacon Theatre, the first New York City performance of the work. Soprano Geraldine McMillian portrayed Mary in a production of the opera given at the Miller Outdoor Theatre in Houston by the Houston Ebony Opera Guild in August 1998.

In May and June 2021, Opera Theatre of Saint Louis presented the opera during its festival season. In May–June 2023, the little OPERA theatre of ny in association with Harlem Opera Theater and National Black Theatre presented it as part of "American One Acts" (a double bill with Down in the Valley by Kurt Weill).

== Roles ==
Role	Voice type	Premiere cast, 11 May 1963 (Miami, Florida) Conductor: Fabien Sevitzky
Bob, the proprietor of a filling station	baritone	Patrick Matthews
Mary, Bob's wife	soprano	Cheryl Claiborne
Nate, Bob's brother	tenor	Ben Laney
Aunt Lou, an old neighbor and close friend of Bob and Mary	mezzo-soprano	
The Sheriff	bass	
The Doctor	mute	
Members of the Church Committee
Townspeople

== Instrumentation ==
The work is scored for two flutes (2nd interchangeable with piccolo), two oboes (2nd interchangeable with English horn), two clarinets, one bass clarinet (interchangeable with B♭ clarinet), two bassoons, four horns, two trumpets, two trombones, timpani, percussion, harp, and strings.

== Synopsis ==
=== Scene 1 ===
The kitchen of Bob and Mary's two-bedroom cottage, adjoined to the filling station.

The opera is set in the present day at a gasoline filling station in a small town along a major American thoroughfare. It is from this filling station that Bob earns a living for himself and his wife Mary, charitably using the profits to educate his younger brother, Nate, according to the promise Bob had made to his mother on her deathbed. To do this, he and Mary have made many sacrifices. Now, Nate is about to graduate from college. Bob is going to attend the graduation while Mary (accompanied by an elderly neighbor, Aunt Lou) stays behind to take care of the business. Mary is joyful, believing that Nate's graduation means the end of their sacrifices and the beginning of a new life. She is taken aback when Bob tells her that they must continue to support Nate until he makes a place for himself in the world. After the church committee has come to felicitate Bob and has gone with him to the railroad station, Mary tells Aunt Lou of her hatred for Nate and all he has made them suffer and deny themselves. She vows to find a way to make Nate reveal himself as the ingrate he really is.

=== Scene 2 ===
The kitchen, one year later.

After a year of laziness and scorn for the honest people around him, Nate has not yet found an outlet for his talents. He lives with Bob and Mary and contributes absolutely nothing to the welfare of the home. In fact, he sleeps while they work. Mary has chosen the method of being sweetly sarcastic to Nate. At the breakfast table, it is apparent that Bob has become aware of the truth behind her barbed remarks.

When Nate comes for his breakfast, he is revealed as an egotistical, neurotic, stupid individual who mistakes Mary's sarcasm for flattery and makes passionate love to her. She responds by laughing at him, scorns him for his weakness, and reaffirms her love for Bob. Enraged, Nate seizes a knife from the table and stabs her. When she screams, Bob and Aunt Lou rush in, the latter immediately going for the Sheriff and the Doctor. Bob, believing Mary dead and still trying to shield his brother, takes the blame. When the Sheriff is about to handcuff him, Mary regains consciousness and cries out that Nate is the culprit. As he is being taken away, Nate cravenly begs Bob to save him. Bob falls on his knees at Mary's side with the cry that at last he understands and that the future will be brighter for both of them.

== See also ==
- List of jazz-influenced classical compositions
