= Blue Steel (Still) =

1934 opera by William Grant Still

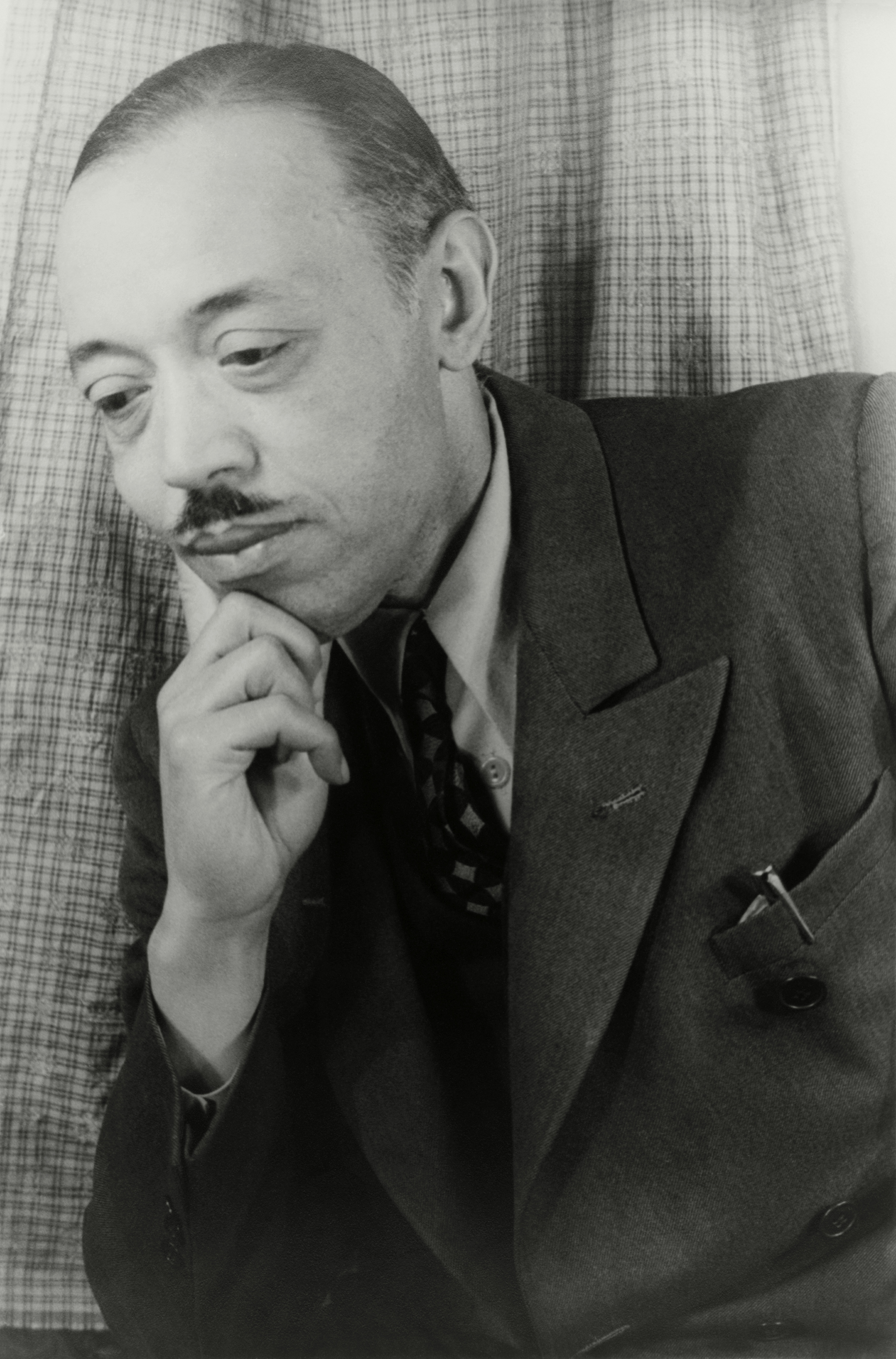
William Grant Still in 1949, photographed by Carl Van Vechten

Blue Steel is a 1934 opera by American composer William Grant Still. Overall, the music assumes a jazz form, harmonically and rhythmically, although at other times, the music merges into the form of a Negro spiritual.

== Overview ==
A description of the opera is as follows:

Blue Steel is an opera [based] on a plot by Carlton Moss [, a playwright and actor,] and libretto by Bruce Forsythe [, a writer and musician]. The subject is Negroid. The scene is a mythical swamp. The protagonists are a Negro from Birmingham (Blue Steel), a young girl of a voodoo cult (Neola), a high priestess of the cult (Doshy), and a high priest (Father Venable), Neola's father. Inevitably there is a conflict between black magic and materialism. Black magic, with the aid of the faith of centuries, is the victor. Musically, Still ... used every element possible to bring about a powerful and compelling climax, from the moment the arresting "Blue Steel" motif introduces the opera, to the final chords. His choruses and drum rhythms are thrilling; his melodies unforgettable. The entire first act is made up of lovely arias, melodies that are emotional, facile and even psychological. The second act is made up mainly of exciting rhythmic choruses and a characteristic ballet dancing the sacred rites for the ceremony of renewal. At the end of the act, Blue Steel shoots the high priest who has attempted to dissuade Neola from eloping with the luring stranger. In the last act, Blue Steel and Neola try to escape, but the voodoo chants and drums have their effect on him, and he leaps madly to his death in the quicksands of the river.

— Catherine Parson Smith, University of California Press

== See also ==
- List of jazz-influenced classical compositions
