= Lenox Avenue (Still) =

1937 composition and 1938 ballet by William Grant Still

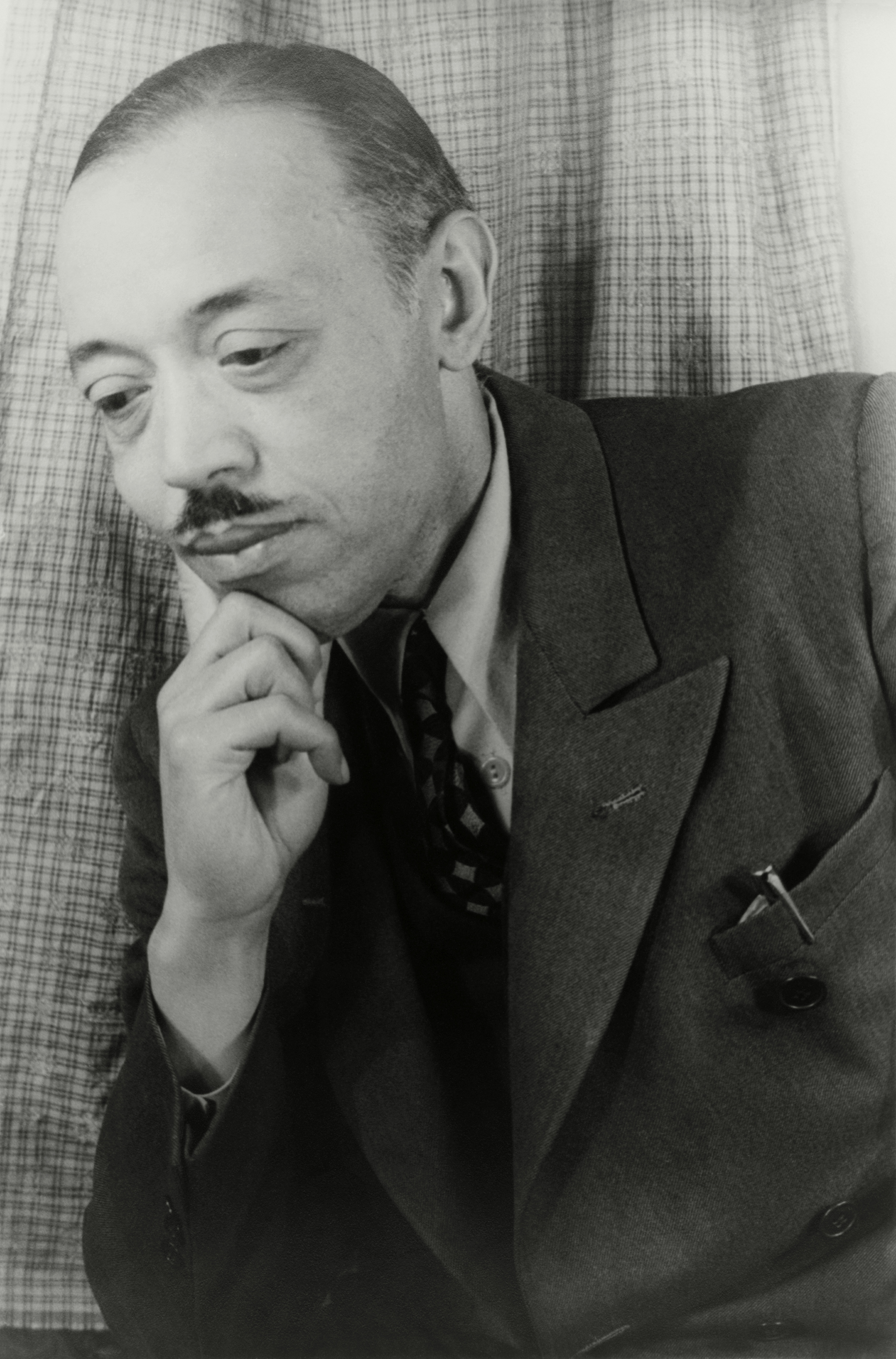
William Grant Still in 1949, photographed by Carl Van Vechten

Lenox Avenue is a series of ten orchestral episodes and a finale composed in 1937 by American composer William Grant Still. The composition is for orchestra, chorus and announcer; the narration was written by Verna Arvey, wife of composer Still. The first performance was broadcast nationally on radio on May 23, 1937, conducted by Howard Barlow. A related ballet version was composed in 1938, and is about twenty-one minutes long.

== Overview ==
Lenox Avenue is the primary north–south route through Harlem in the upper portion of the New York City borough of Manhattan, and was the heart of Harlem during the Harlem Renaissance in the 1930s. In 1932, Harlem had been firmly established as the world capital of jazz and African-American culture. Jazz flourished and grew on Lenox Avenue, and is thought by some to be one of the most important streets in the world for African American culture.

Still had composed the orchestral version of Lenox Avenue based on experiences he witnessed in Harlem. The composition, consisting of ten episodes and a finale, was commissioned by the Columbia Broadcasting System and was first conducted in a national broadcast by Howard Barlow on May 23, 1937, and repeated on October 17, 1937. Later, Still conducted it many other times in concert. The later ballet version was first presented by the Dance Theatre Group in Los Angeles in May 1938 with Norma Gould as the choreographer and Charles Teske as the lead dancer.

The origin of the ballet, according to the composer's wife, Verna Arvey, was described as follows:

A new kind of music was requested for Still's next composition when CBS, under Deems Taylor's guidance, decided to commission six leading American composers to write compositions especially for radio. It was a relatively new medium for serious music, so the project was considered experimental. Still composed a series of pieces – actually a suite – for orchestra, piano soloist, chorus and narrator, inspired by street scenes in Harlem.

— Verna Arvey, AfriClassical.com

Film historian Tony Thomas describes the work as "fusing drama with spiritual-like chants and jazz idioms, Lenox Avenue is pure Americana and one that had great influence.

== Sections ==
Set in Harlem in the mid-1930s, the score is marked into sections:

1. The Crap Game
2. The Flirtation
3. The Fight
4. The Law
5. Dance of the Boys
6. Dance of the Man Down South
7. The Old Man (The Philosopher)
8. The Mission
9. The House Rent Party (includes "Blues")
10. The Orator
11. Finale

== See also ==
- List of ballets by title
- List of jazz-influenced classical compositions
