= Symphony No. 2 (Still) =

1937 symphony by William Grant Still

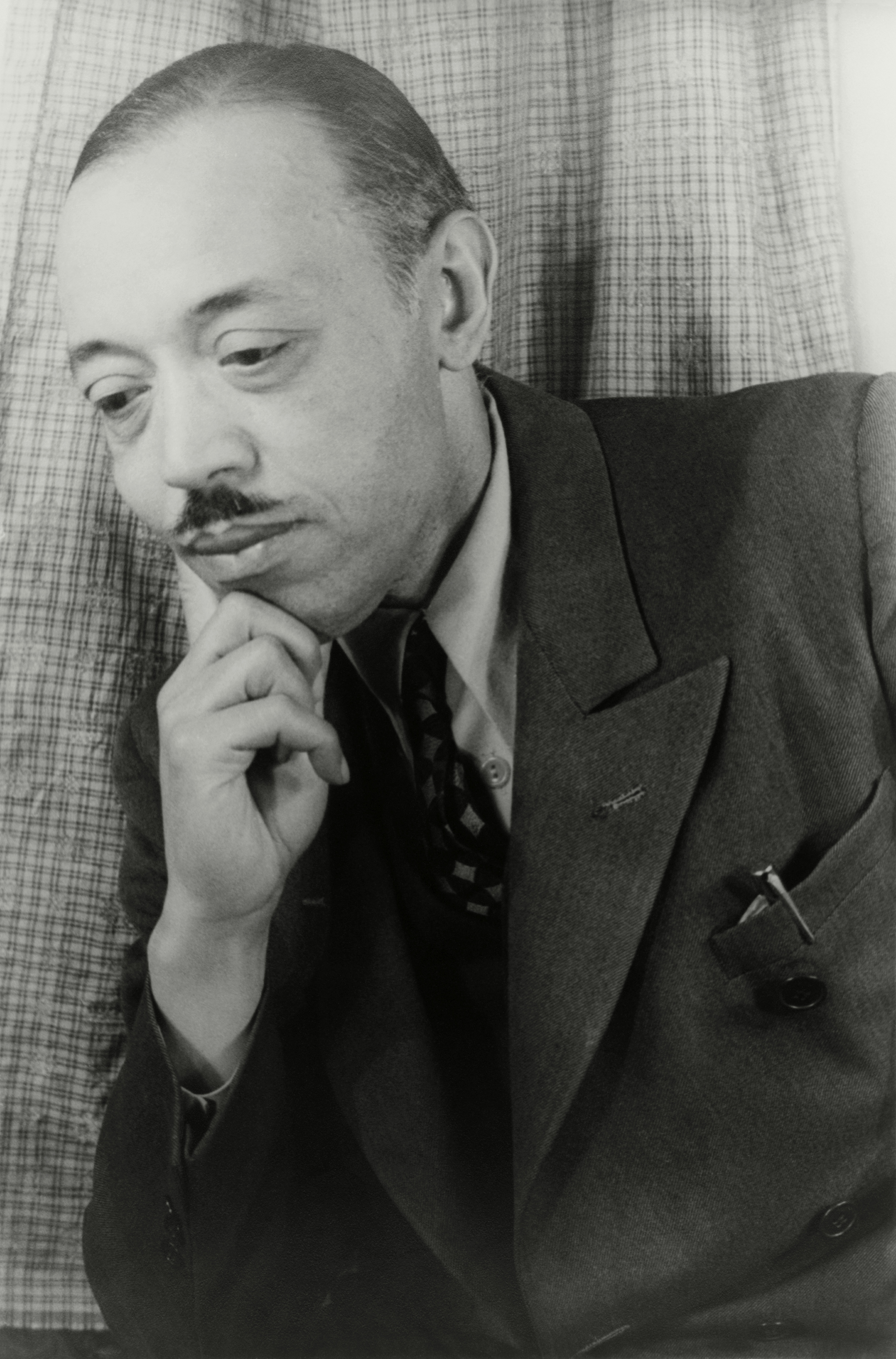
William Grant Still in 1949, photographed by Carl Van Vechten

Symphony No. 2 in G minor, also known as Symphony No. 2 "Song of a New Race", is a 1937 composition in four movements by American composer William Grant Still. The work was first performed on December 10, 1937, by the Philadelphia Orchestra led by conductor Leopold Stokowski. The symphony is about thirty minutes long.

== Overview ==
William Grant Still contrasted his Symphony No. 2 with his earlier Symphony No. 1. If Symphony No. 1 "represented the Negro of days not far removed from the Civil War," Symphony No. 2 represented "the American colored man of today, in so many instances a totally new individual produced through the fusion of White, Indian and Negro bloods". According to one reviewer commenting on the premiere performance of the symphony by the Philadelphia Orchestra, "[The symphony]'s characteristically expansive, lyrical string writing seems specifically intended to exploit that orchestra’s famously silky string sound. Near the climax of the first movement, and at key moments elsewhere, the brasses-trumpets and trombones especially, punctuate the texture with gestures suggesting call and response, elements of the African American essence that persistently asserts itself even as blacks were more fully integrated into the wider, more diverse American culture."

== Movements ==
The symphony is in four movements as follows:

1. Slowly
2. Slowly and deeply expressive
3. Moderately fast
4. Moderately slow

== Reviews ==
Allan Kozinn of The New York Times notes the work's, "bright, rhythmically vital third movement".

== See also ==
- List of jazz-influenced classical compositions
