= Miss Sally's Party =

1940 ballet by William Grant Still

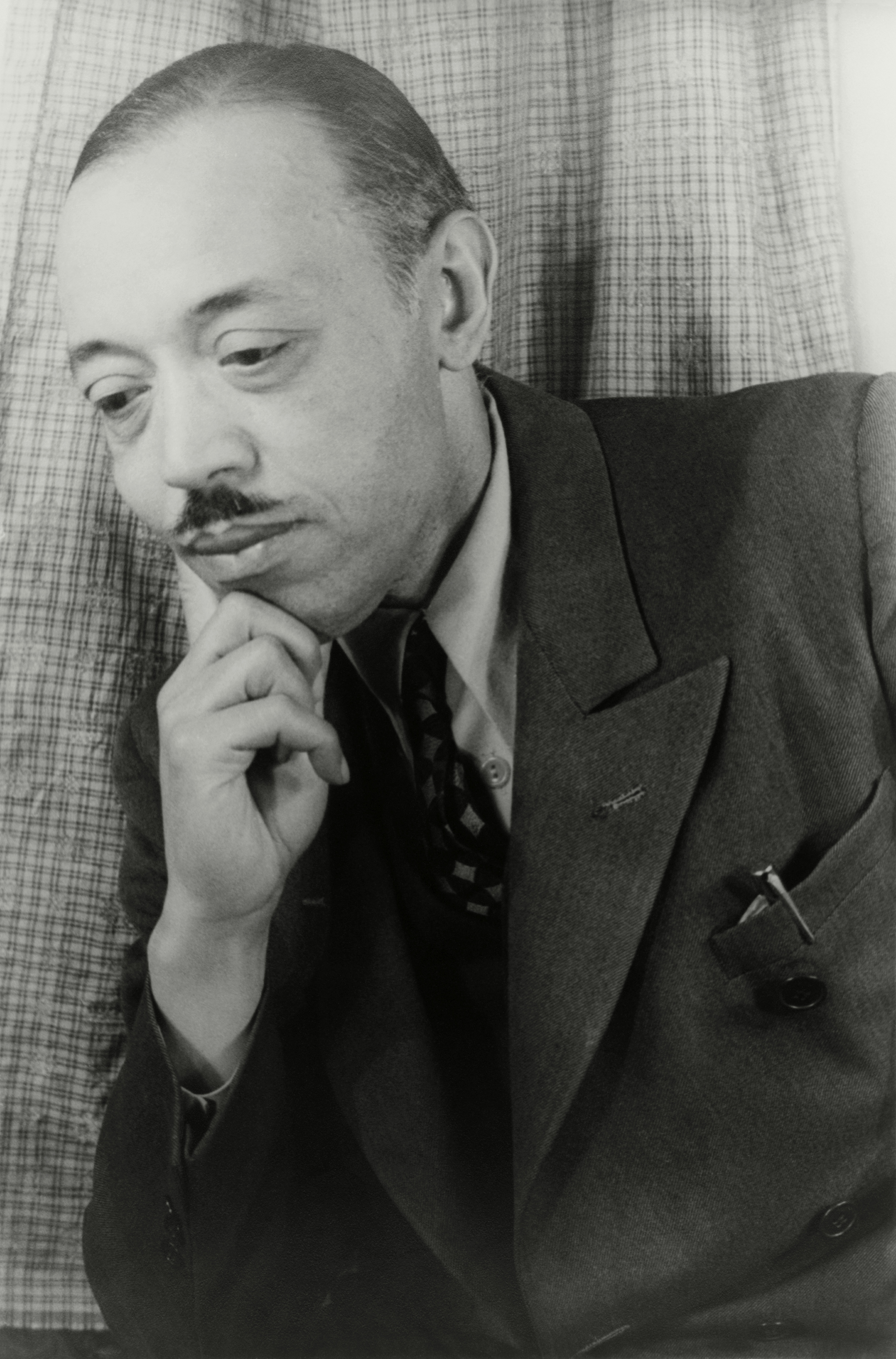
William Grant Still in 1949, photographed by Carl Van Vechten

Miss Sally's Party is a 1940 ballet composition in eight-movements by American composer William Grant Still. A related libretto was written by Verna Arvey, wife of composer Still. The ballet was first performed on May 2, 1941, and is about nineteen minutes long.

== Overview ==
A description of the ballet is well presented as follows:

The highlight of Miss Sally's party is a cake. The origin of the dance of that name, a cake walk is a dancing contest, so named because the prize is sometimes a cake. The leading contestants for the cake are Jim Slick and Jake, the latter being Miss Sally's boyfriend. Jim Slick, a strutting braggart, intercepts two mischievous boys who were sneaking up to the cake, warning them not to swipe any of "his" prize. As the contest progresses (to the strains of an irresistible example of the "cakewalk") it appears that Jim is the best. But just before the last dance, the boys slip a frog down the back of his shirt, causing him to twitch and jump and miss his steps, so Jake and Sally win the prize.

— Joseph Stevenson, AllMusic

== Movements ==
The ballet is in eight movements as follows:

1. Introduction
2. The Square Dance
3. Tia's Dance
4. Toby and Tip's Dance
5. The Country Dance
6. Miss Sally's Dance
7. Jim Slick's Dance
8. The Cake Walk Contest

== See also ==
- List of ballets by title
- List of jazz-influenced classical compositions
