= Three Visions =

1935 work by William Grant Still

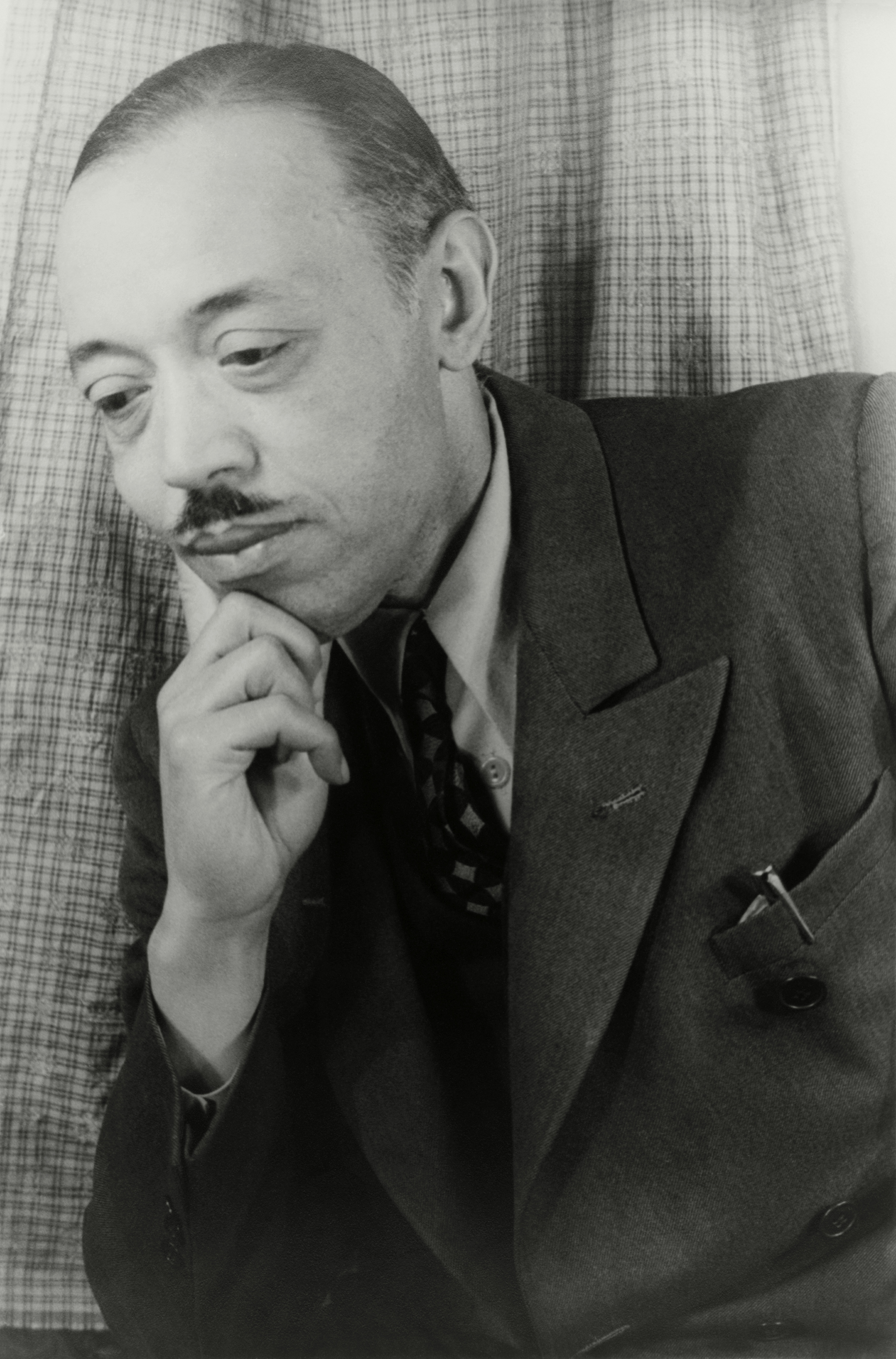
William Grant Still in 1949, photographed by Carl Van Vechten

Three Visions is a 1935 suite in three parts for solo piano, and later, the second part, Summerland, for chamber orchestra, by American composer William Grant Still. According to Judith Anne Still, the composer's daughter, "The three segments of the suite, Dark Horsemen, Summerland, and Radiant Pinnacle, tell the story of the human soul after death: the body expires, and the soul goes on to an apocalyptic judgment. If it is seen that the past life has been a good one, the soul may enter “heaven,” or “Summerland”. After a period of time, the soul may reincarnate to learn additional earthly lessons on the human plane. Some souls reincarnate many times in a constant circular progress toward Godly perfection." Three Visions was composed by Still for his wife, Verna Arvey, who first played the composition in Los Angeles in 1936. The suite is about eleven minutes long.

== Overview ==
A description of Three Visions is presented as follows:

One of the finest groups of piano compositions to be written by any American composer is the Three Visions by William Grant Still, published by J. Fischer and Bro. The harmonies in these Visions are strange. By them, the listener is aware that the "visions" are real only to the dreamer. As music, they exemplify the scope of Still's musical individuality. Once again, he has given us strongly contrasted moods, unified by his own personal idiom and by his spiritual concept of the music he creates. The first Vision is one of horror. It is entitled "Dark Horsemen", and in it the hoof beats of the horses alternate with the shrieks of anguish they cause by their very presence ... The second Vision is a portrait of promised beauty in the afterlife. It is called "Summerland" after the peaceful Heaven of the Spiritualists ... It has been arranged by the composer for small orchestra, and published. The last Vision is of the radiant future, a vision of aspiration that is ever-climbing, never-ending. It is called "Radiant Pinnacle" ... Its continual rhythmic flow and its final, deceptive cadence leave one with the feeling that there is more to come: that the last word has not been said.

— Catherine Parson Smith, University of California Press

== Parts ==
Three Visions is in three parts as follows:

1. Dark Horsemen
2. Summerland
3. Radiant Pinnacle

Still created a version of Summerland for violin and orchestra.

== See also ==
- List of jazz-influenced classical compositions
