= Sahdji (ballet) =

1930 ballet by William Grant Still

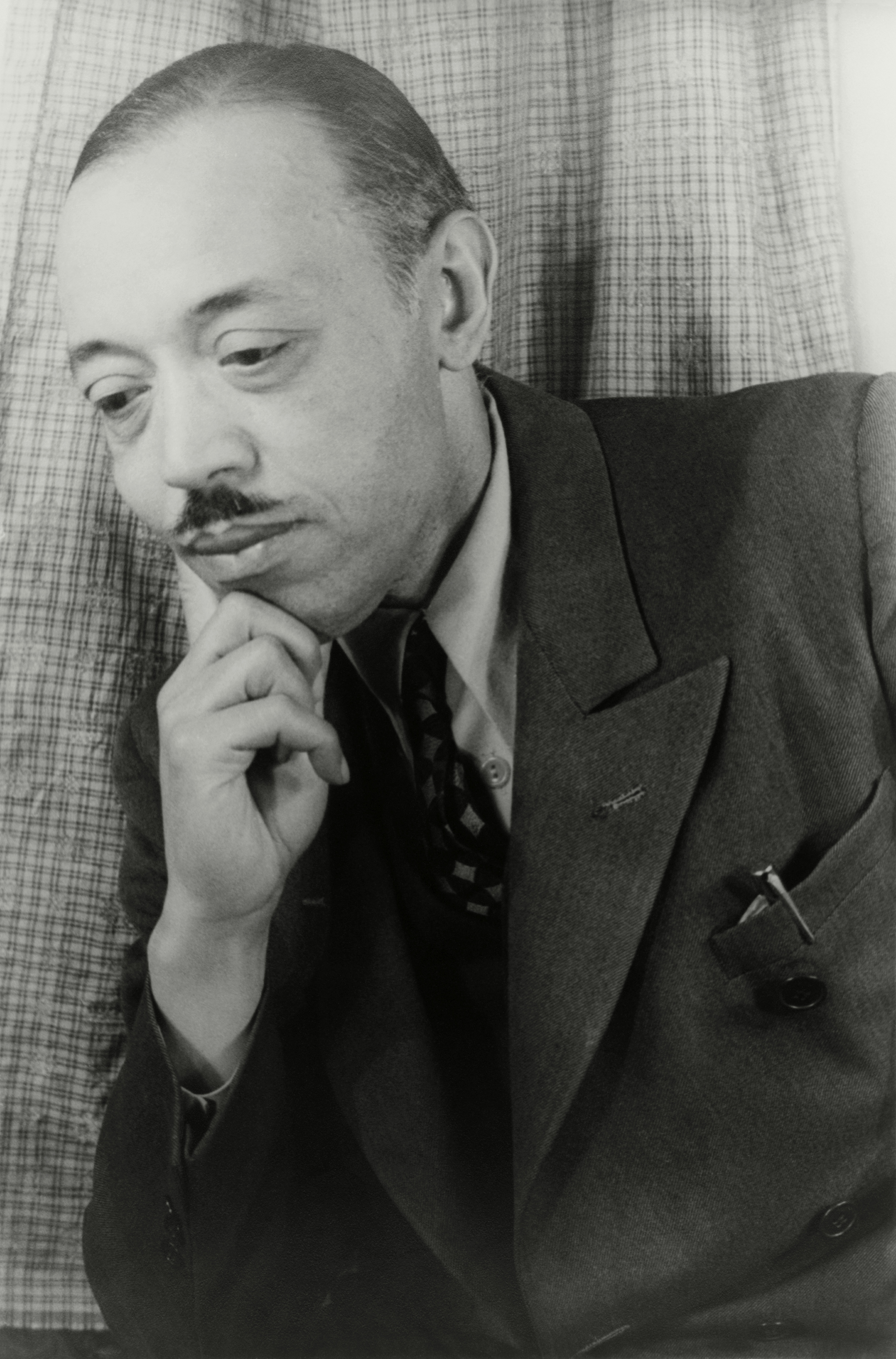
William Grant Still in 1949, photographed by Carl Van Vechten

Sahdji is a 1930 ballet composition in two-movements by American composer William Grant Still. The ballet was first performed in 1931 under the direction of Howard Hanson at the Eastman School of Music. The work is about twenty minutes long.

== Overview ==
A description of the ballet is presented as follows:

The setting of the ballet (which calls for chorus, as well) is a hunting festival of the Azande tribe in central Africa. Sahdji, the favorite wife of the Azande chieftain Konombju, is infatuated with his nephew and successor, Mrabo. While Konombju is away on a hunting expedition, Sahdji and Mrabo betray him; a few hours later, at sunset, the hunters return carrying Konombju's body: he has been killed on the expedition. According to tribal custom, the favorite wife of the chieftain must take her life when her husband dies. Sahdji, torn between her loyalty to the death vow and her desire for life and the love of Mrabo, dances before the bier of Konombju and finally stabs herself with the sacrificial dagger.

— Shirley Fleming, Mercury Records

== Movements ==
1. Part I.
2. Part II.

== See also ==
- List of ballets by title
- List of jazz-influenced classical compositions
