= M. W. Gibbs High School =

Former high school in Little Rock, Arkansas, US

Coordinates: 34.73277°N 92.28599°W

M. W. Gibbs High School was a segregated public high school for African-American students in Little Rock, Arkansas, United States. It was named after local judge Mifflin Wistar Gibbs. It was open by 1892, when Jefferson G. Ish was appointed principal. In 1909 the school was listed as being at 1600 Scott Street. By 1913 the school was at West 18th and South Ringo streets; that building was still standing in 1939.

== Notable alumni ==
- William Grant Still (1895–1978), composer
