= Miniatures (Still) =

1948 music composed by William Grant Still

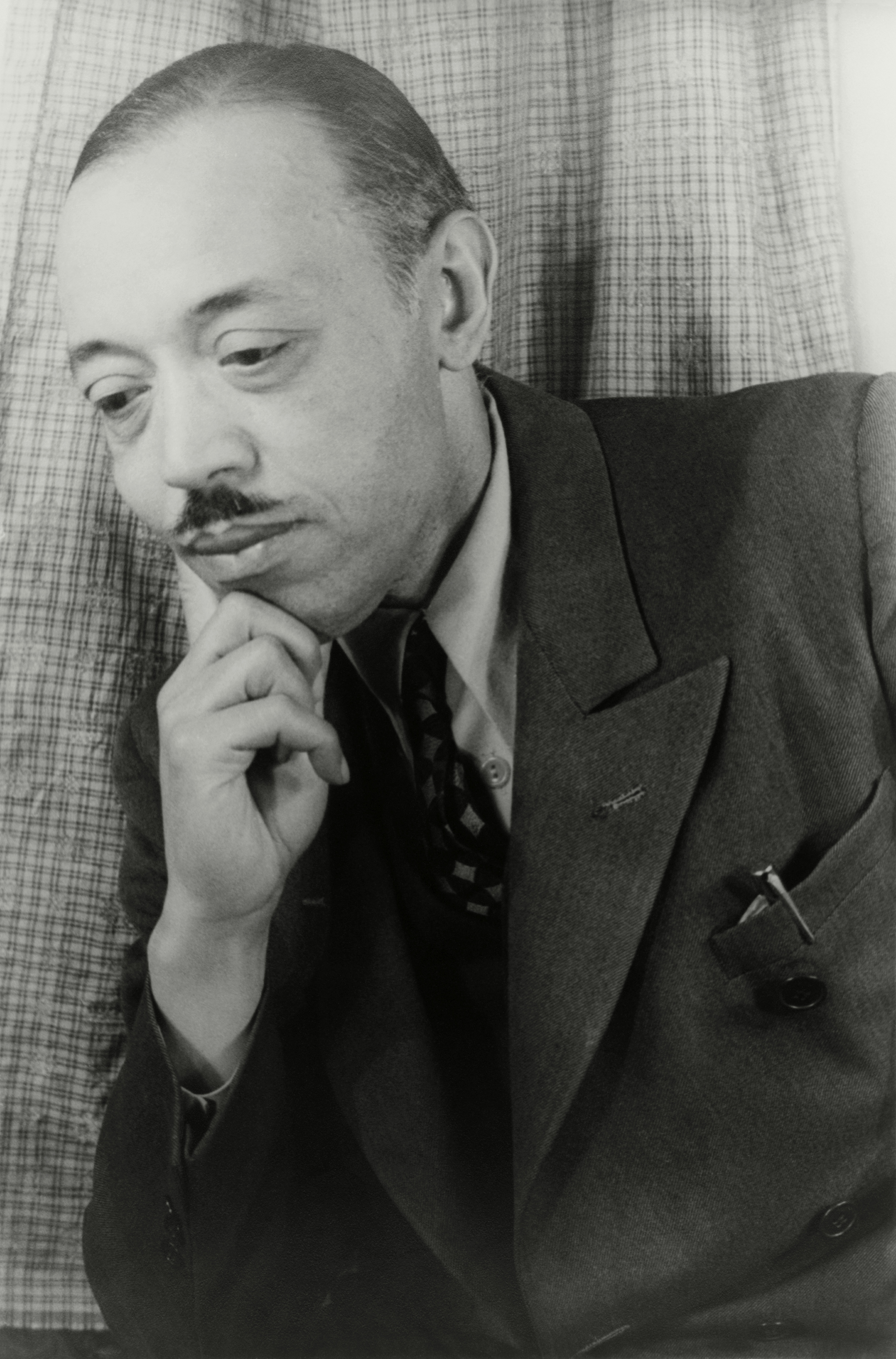
Photograph of William Grant Still in 1949 by Carl Van Vechten

Miniature is a musical composition in five movements composed in 1948 by American composer William Grant Still. The composition was originally created for trio (flute, oboe, and piano) and later, in 1963, was arranged for quintet (flute, oboe, bassoon, clarinet, and horn). The composition is approximately twelve minutes long.

== Overview ==
The work was dedicated jointly to the conductor and cellist and to the oboist and author, repectedly Sir John and Lady Evelyn Rothwell Barbirolli: “This suite is based on folk songs of the Americas, and is a souvenir of the visit to America of Sir John and Lady Barbirolli, and of the many friends made by them during their stay.”

According to Staff, a publication of International Opus, the composition is well described as follows:

[William Grant] Still broke many barriers during his career, including being the first African-American composer to write orchestral works and have them performed by major symphony orchestras, as well as being the first conductor of color to lead a major American symphony. His musical style incorporates a variety of African-American styles, from spirituals to blues and jazz, in addition to European, Latin American, and other folk music genres. ... Miniatures aired on N.P.R.'s Performance Today and performed at the Kennedy Center, the five contrasting movements display a variety of Afro, Anglo, Latino, and Native American musical styles; I Ride An Old Paint (Cowboy Song - U.S.A.), Adolorido (Mexico), Jesus Is A Rock In The Weary Land (Spiritual, bluesy clarinet solo - U.S.A.), Yaravi (Peru), and A Frog Went A-Courtin’ (U.S.A.).

— Staff, International Opus

== Movements ==
The work is in five movements as follows:

1. I Ride an Old Paint (Cowboy Song – U.S.A.)
2. Adolorido (Mexico)
3. Jesus Is A Rock In The Weary Land (Spiritual, U.S.A.)
4. Yaravi (Peru)
5. Frog Went a-Courting (U.S.A.)

== See also ==
- List of jazz-influenced classical compositions
