= Symphony No. 5 (Still) =

1945 symphony by William Grant Still

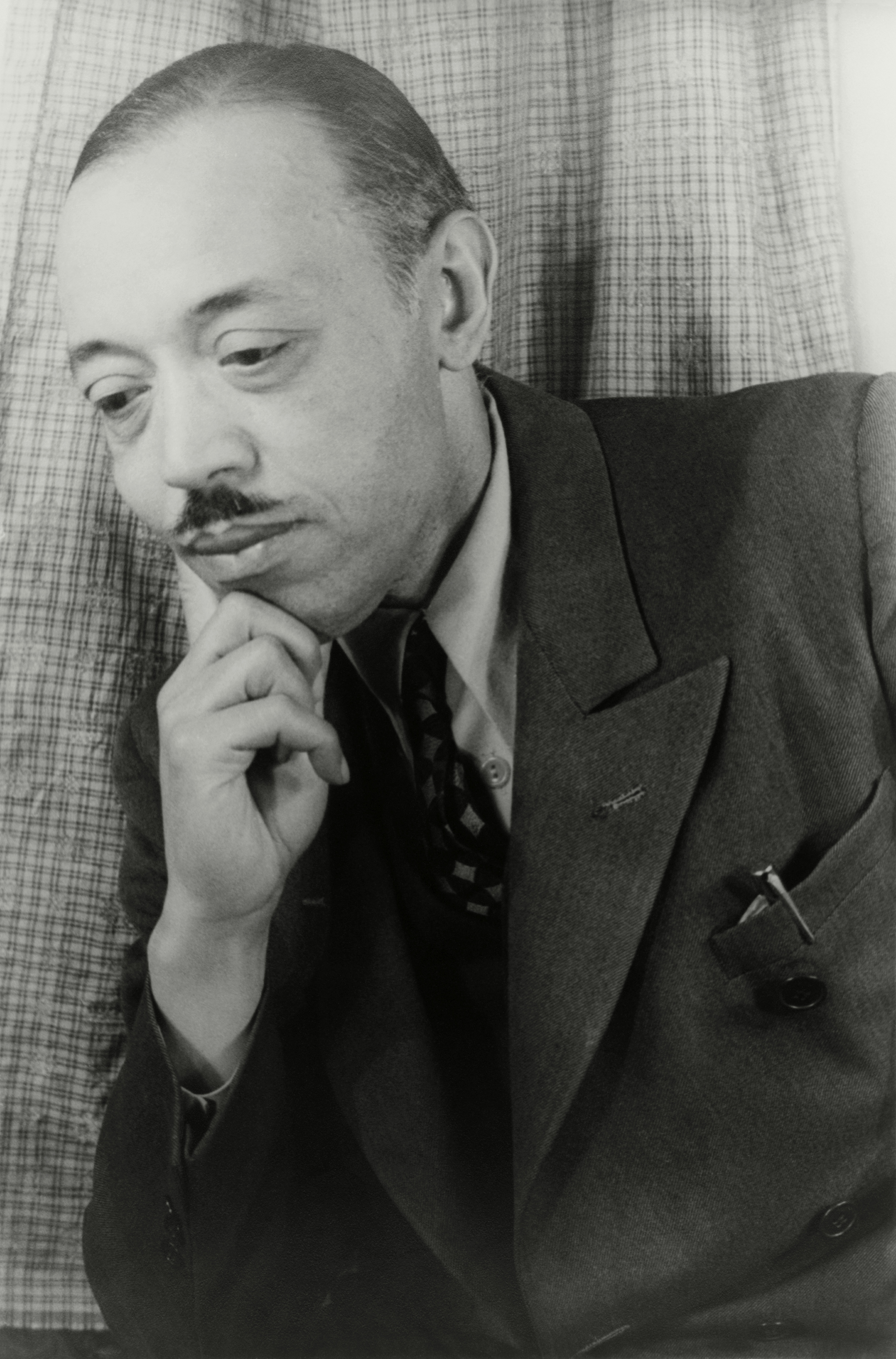
William Grant Still in 1949, photographed by Carl Van Vechten

Symphony No. 5, also known as Symphony No. 5 "Western Hemisphere", is a 1945 (rev 1970) composition in four movements by American composer William Grant Still. The work was first performed on November 9, 1970 by the Oberlin College Orchestra conducted by Robert Baustian. The symphony is about twenty minutes long.

== Overview ==
According to one reviewer, the symphony "expresses the composer's thoughts on the natural and human resources of all of the countries of the Americas". William Grant Still described his symphony as follows:

One day in eternity has come to its close. A mighty civilization has begun, come to a climax, and declined. In the darkness, the past is swept away. When the new day dawns, the lands of the Western Hemisphere are raised from the bosom of the Atlantic. They are endowed by the Great Intelligence who created them and who controls their destiny with virtues unlike any that has gone before: qualities which will find counterparts in the characters of the men who will inhabit them eventually, and who will make them the abode of freedoms, of friendship, of the sharing of resources and achievements of the mind and the spirit. These are our fellow-Americans in Latin America, Canada, and the islands of the Western Seas, who are today working with us to convert our ideals into realities.

== Movements ==
The symphony is in four movements:

1. The vigorous, life-sustaining forces of the Hemisphere. Briskly.
2. The natural beauties of the Hemisphere. Slowly and with utmost grace,
3. The nervous energy of the Hemisphere. Energetically.
4. The overshadowing spirit of kindness and justice in the Hemisphere. Moderately.

== See also ==
- List of jazz-influenced classical compositions
