= Kaintuck' (Still) =

1935 symphonic poem by William Grant Still

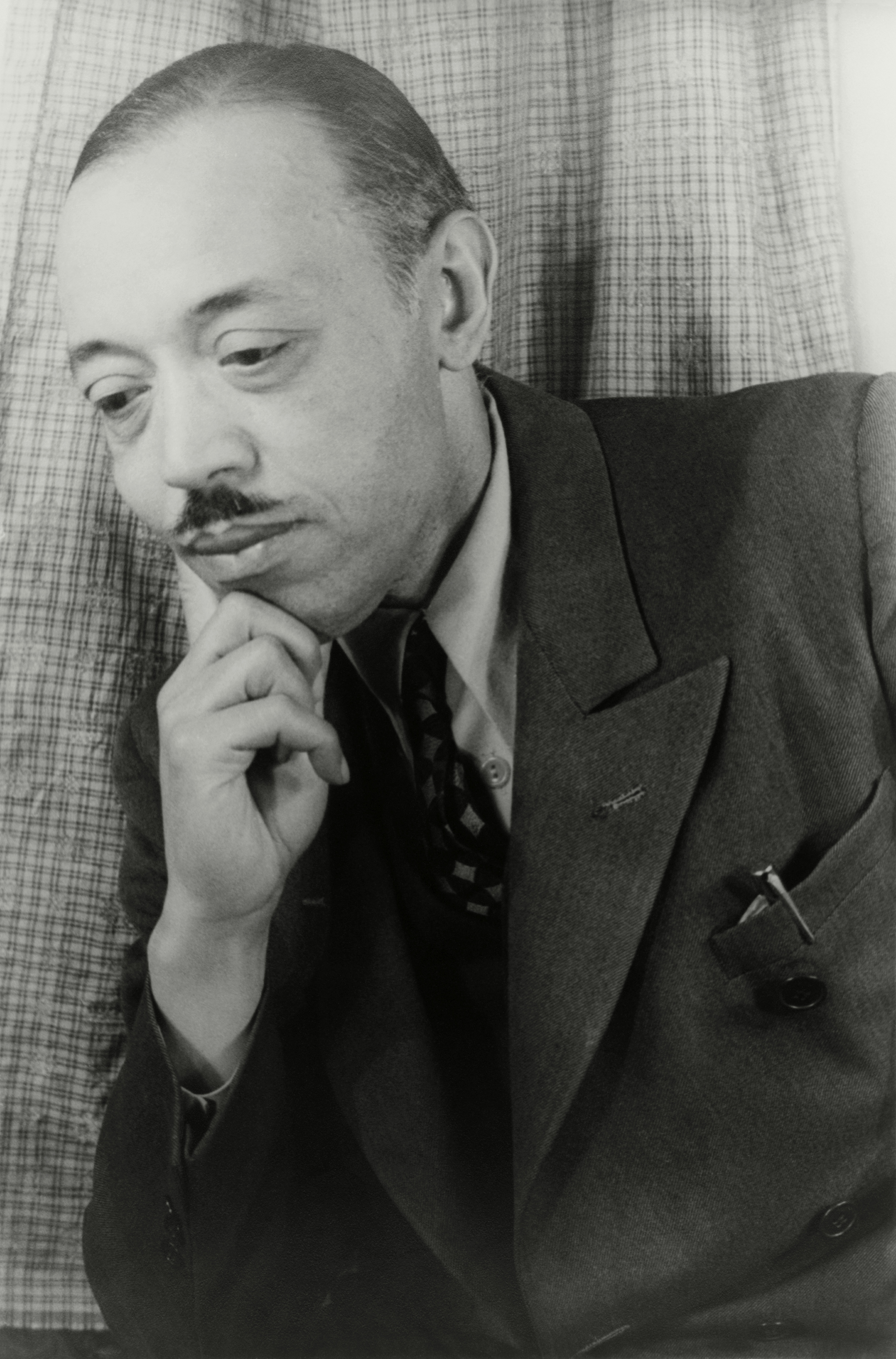
William Grant Still in 1949, photographed by Carl Van Vechten

Kaintuck' (Kentucky) is a 1935 symphonic poem for piano and orchestra by American composer William Grant Still.

== Background ==
The work, written after being inspired by a train trip to Kentucky and commissioned by the League of Composers, and originally scored for piano and symphony orchestra, was first performed on two pianos, with the composer's wife, Verna Arvey, as soloist, in Los Angeles on October 28, 1935 at a Pro Musica concert. Since then, the work has been played in a full orchestra version by Howard Hanson at the Eastman School of Music in Rochester, New York. The work, dedicated to Still's wife ("To my wife, Verna Arvey"), is about eleven minutes long.

== Overview ==
A description of the symphonic poem is as follows:

[The work is] short and poetic ... It was written to express musically [Still's] inner reactions to the peaceful, shimmering, misty sunlight on the blue grass of Kentucky. It is a subjective not an objective picture ... Kaintuck' is built chiefly on two themes: everything else grows out of them. The piano opens the poem quietly, then runs into a rhythmic accompaniment to the orchestral statement of the themes. Both the piano and the orchestra are heard in huge, authoritative chords just before the cadenza by the solo instrument. This cadenza, unlike most, does not aim toward the exploitation of the interpreter, but simply and colorfully enhances the thematic and harmonic material that has preceded it. The theme is re-stated, and the piano closes the poem as quietly as it opened it. It is haunting, memorable.

— Catherine Parson Smith, University of California Press

The sound of the steam locomotive can be heard in the piece.

== Reviews ==
Music reviewer Mary Carr Moore considered Kaintuck' a work of "real power and splendid proportions". James Manheim of AllMusic writes that the work features "impressionist harmonies" and is "a gem".

== See also ==
- List of jazz-influenced classical compositions
- List of symphonic poems
- Bluegrass music
