= Symphony No. 3 (Still) =

1958 symphony by William Grant Still

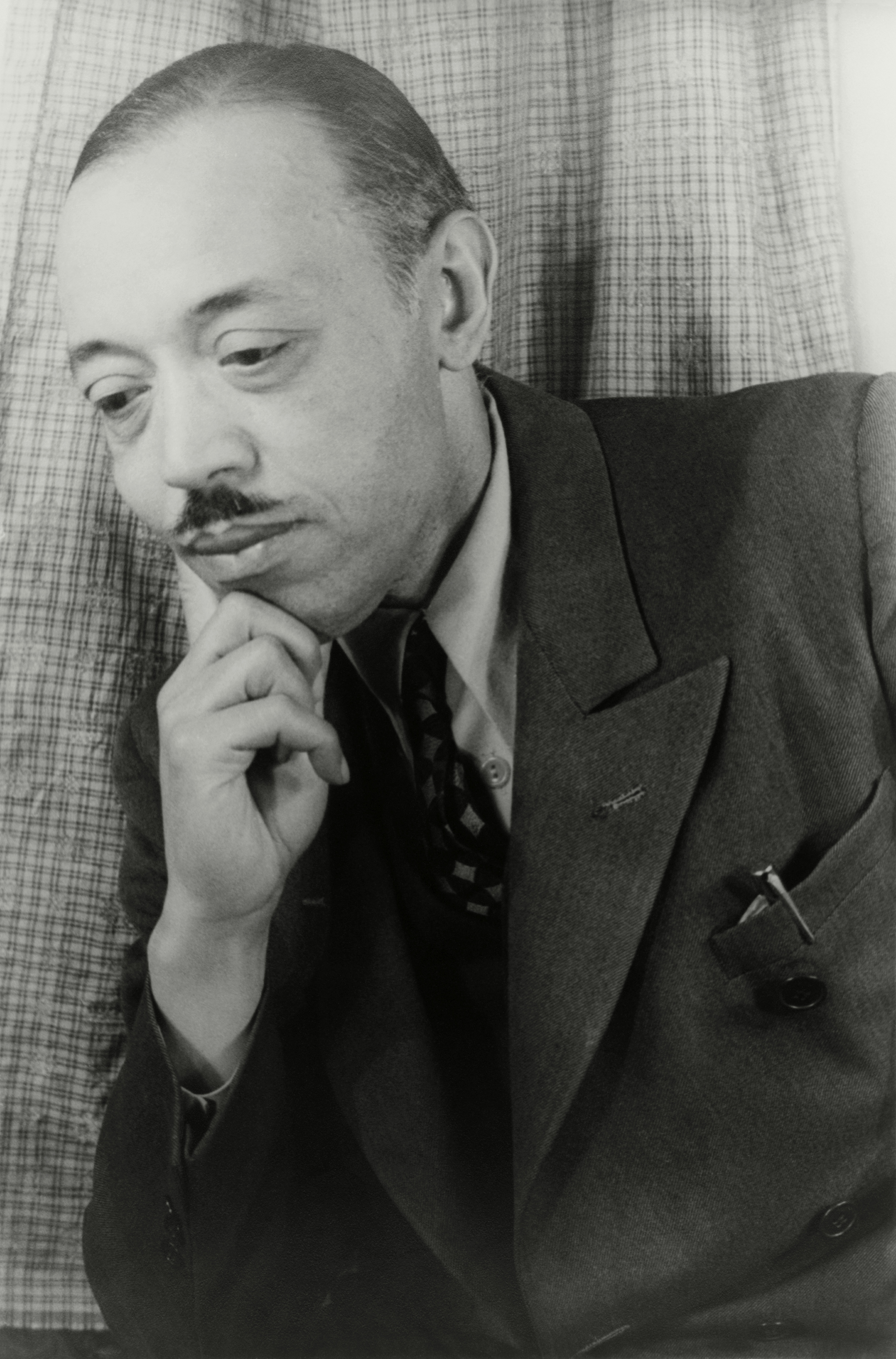
William Grant Still in 1949, photographed by Carl Van Vechten

Symphony No. 3, also known as Symphony No. 3 "The Sunday Symphony", is a 1958 composition in four movements by American composer William Grant Still. The work was first performed on February 12, 1984 by the North Arkansas Symphony Orchestra conducted by Carlton Woods. The symphony is about eighteen minutes long.

== Overview ==
Symphony No. 3 is a programmatic work that depicts the Sunday life of “a devout worshipper”. Composed in four movements, "with titles suggesting the activities carried out on a typical Sunday, from waking up to the end of the day. A joyous first movement as an optimistic start to the holiday, followed by prayer. After a relaxed dance the day ends happily waiting for the new day." Overall, the music expresses the composer's religious beliefs, "each day being a new opportunity to serve the creator".

== Movements ==
The symphony is in four movements as follows:

1. The Awakening. Moderately fast
2. Prayer. Very slowly
3. Relaxation. Gaily
4. Day's End and a New Beginning. Resolutely

== See also ==
- List of jazz-influenced classical compositions
