= The American Scene (Still) =

1957 music composed by William Grant Still

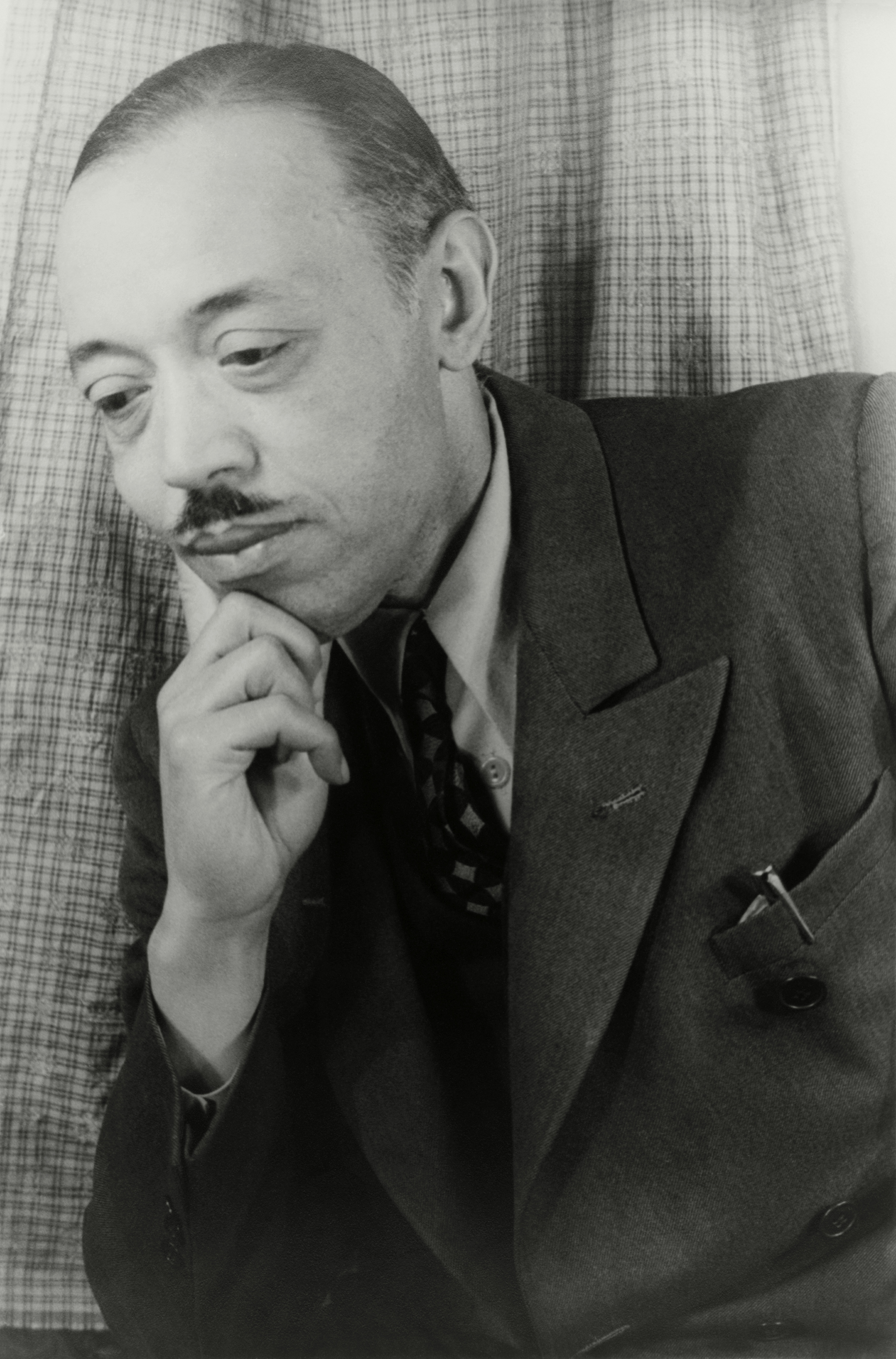
William Grant Still in 1949, photographed by Carl Van Vechten

The American Scene is a musical composition consisting of five orchestral suites composed in 1957 by American composer William Grant Still.

== Overview ==
The composition is described as follows:

[The work depicts] life, scenery, and culture in various parts of the United States. The themes are original ones written in some of the American idioms. The work was commissioned by Adrian Michaelis for The Standard School Broadcasts. Some of the suites aired on the NBC Western Network from 1959 to 1960.

— Erica Neidlinger, The Wind Repertory Project

== Movements ==
The collection of suites is as follows:

Suite No. 1 - The East

1. On the Village Green
2. Berkshire Night
3. Manhattan Skyline

Suite No. 2 - The South

1. Florida Night (Soft Loveliness)
2. Levee Land (Birthplace of Blues and Spirituals)
3. A New Orleans' Street (The festive spirit of yesterday)

Suite No. 3 - The Old West

1. Song of the Plainsmen
2. Sioux Love Song (Based on a Sioux Melody)
3. Tribal Dance

Suite No. 4 - The Far West

1. The Plaza (Los Angeles)
2. Sundown Land
3. Navaho Country

Suite No. 5 - A Mountain, a Memorial and a Song

1. Grand Teton (A symbol of America's strength)
2. Tomb of the Unknown Soldier ("Our Boys" will never be forgotten)
3. Song of the Rivermen (They sing of the Mississippi)

== See also ==
- List of jazz-influenced classical compositions
