= Symphony No. 4 (Still) =

1947 symphony by William Grant Still

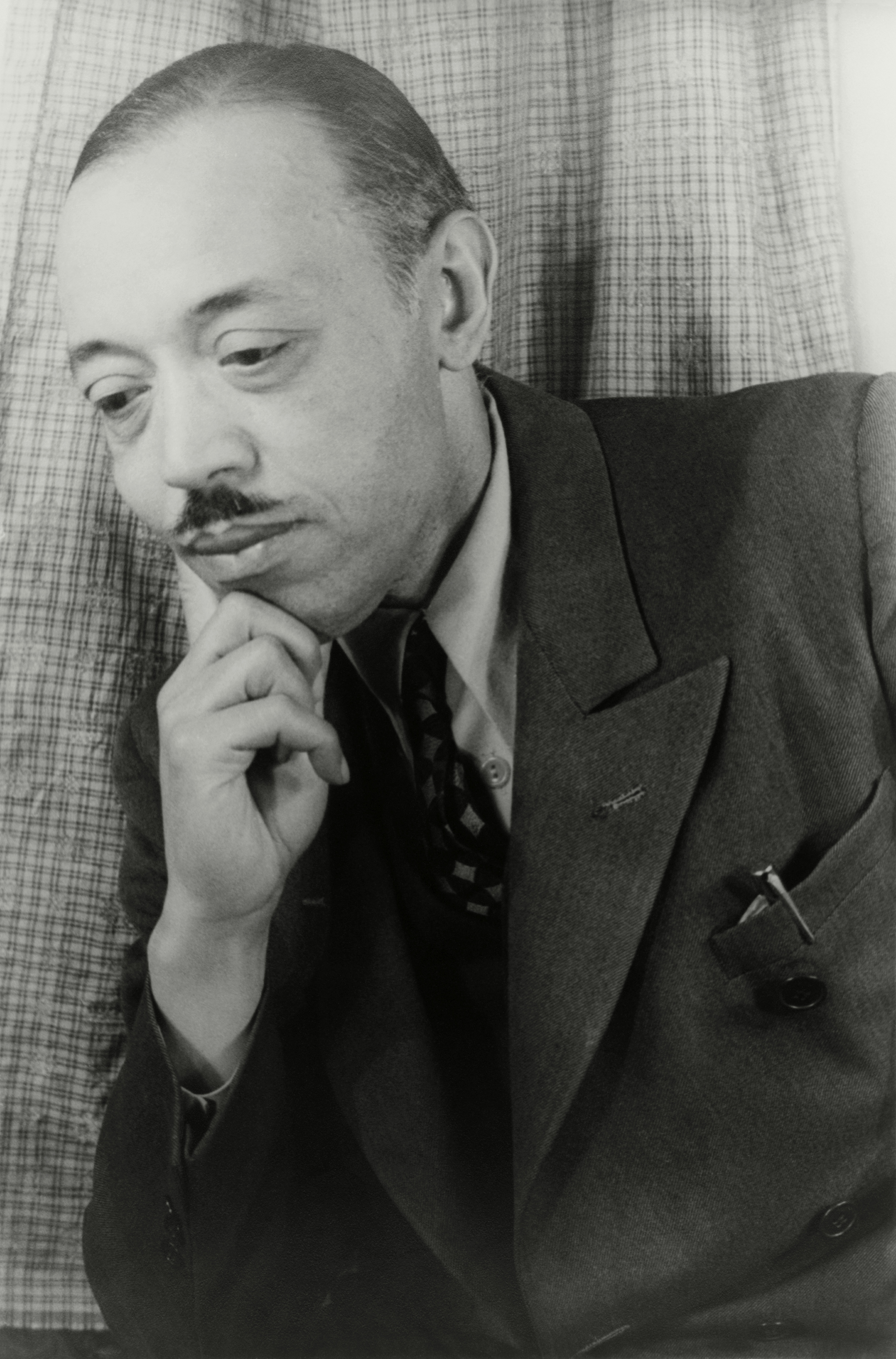
William Grant Still in 1949, photographed by Carl Van Vechten

Symphony No. 4, also known as Symphony No. 4 "Autochthonous", is a 1947 composition in four movements by American composer William Grant Still. The work was first performed on March 18, 1951, by the Oklahoma City Symphony Orchestra conducted by Victor Alessandro. The symphony is about twenty-six minutes long.

== Overview ==
Symphony No. 4 is intended to represent the spirit of the American people, and has its roots in the soil of America itself, rather than referring to aboriginal or indigenous sources. Still described the movements of the work in this way: "1. Moderately: The spirit of optimism and energy: the American ability to ‘get things done’ 2. Slowly: pensive, then later in the second subject, animated in a folky way 3. With a graceful lilt: humorous and unmistakably typical of our country and its rhythms 4. Slowly and reverently: the warmth and the spiritual side of the American people, their love of mankind." The music suggests the mixing of musical cultures in North America. Judith Still, the composer's daughter, explained that "[the symphony] is praise for people who came ‘from the soil,’ abused and enslaved, and recognizes the power of those who had been so mightily put upon when they triumphed with honor over a difficult past. Out of the soil of oppression and forced degradation they rose up and acquitted themselves, bringing along their unique songs, humor, and distinctive, vibrant culture.” According to reviewer Douglas Shadle, "an African American musical identity springs to the fore within the context of a broader, more complex American cultural fabric".

== Movements ==
The symphony is in four movements as follows:

1. Moderately
2. Slowly
3. With a graceful lilt
4. Slowly and reverently

== See also ==
- List of jazz-influenced classical compositions
