= La Guiablesse (ballet) =

1927 ballet by William Grant Still

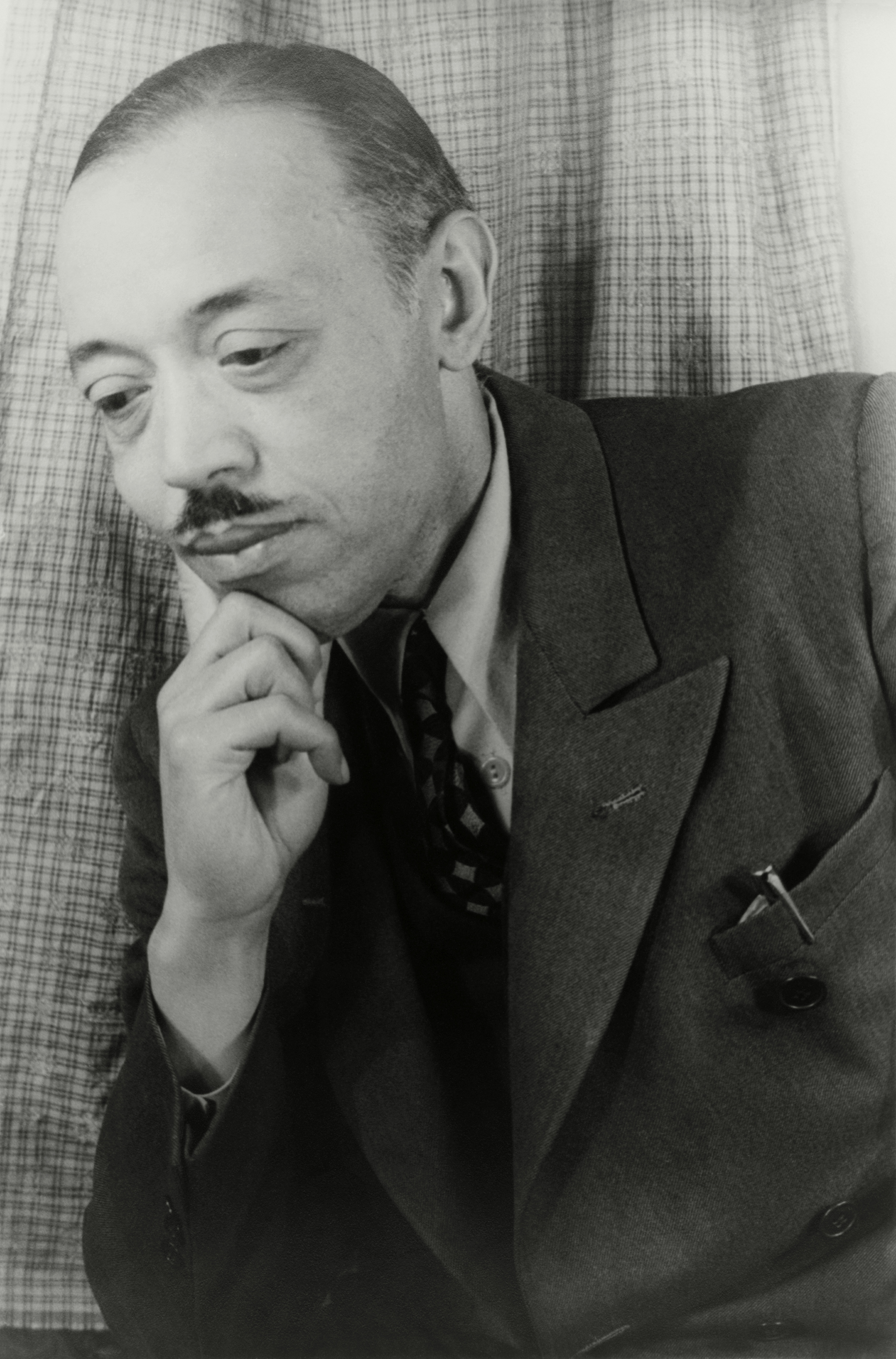
William Grant Still in 1949, photographed by Carl Van Vechten

La Guiablesse is a 1927 ballet composition in nine-movements by American composer William Grant Still. The ballet was first performed in 1933 by Howard Hanson and Thelma Biracree at the Eastman School of Music in Rochester, New York, and Ruth Page in Chicago, Illinois. The work is about nineteen minutes long.

== Overview ==
A description of the ballet is presented as follows:

La Guiablesse (a patois word meaning female devil) is based on a scenario by Ruth Page which in turn was based on a legend of Martinique. The opening theme is that of La Guiablesse. This appears throughout the score, and finally in the funeral march at the end. The she-devil herself is introduced by an offstage contralto solo, a haunting, wordless melody. Sensuous beauty and dramatic intensity mark the music. It progresses from a fairly quiet and atmospheric beginning to a thrilling climax. The story concerns two young lovers, Adou and Yzore, whose tender love is interrupted by the appearance of the greedily sensuous she-devil. She lures Adou away from his village sweetheart. Then, just as he is past returning, the music assumes a horrible tinge as the beautiful woman turns into a demon, and like demoniac laughter it continues as she insists on claiming her prey. Adou, unconscious, falls from her embrace into the pit below.

— Catherine Parson Smith, University of California Press

== Movements ==
The ballet is in nine movements as follows:

1. La Guiablessee Prelude
2. Children's Dance
3. Yzore's Waltz
4. The Bearers
5. Pas De Deux
6. Genedarme
7. Dance
8. La Guiablesse
9. Final Scene

== Reviews ==
Reviewer Herman Devries of the Chicago American noted, "[The ballet] is far above the average ballet music ... both in quality of invention and in the value of its themes and imagination. It is a highly-colored, vivid, evocative, gorgeous score." Another reviewer, Stuart R. Sabin of Rochester, wrote, "The music is charming, picturesque and dramatically suggestive, never padded, never divorced from the action, yet with an individual appeal of its own."

== See also ==
- List of ballets by title
- List of jazz-influenced classical compositions
