= Yamekraw =

Jazz musical composition

Yamekraw, a Negro Rhapsody is a jazz musical composition written by James P. Johnson in 1927 about a neighborhood of Savannah, Georgia. It was a response to George Gershwin's Rhapsody in Blue. It was initially composed for the piano, but was first performed at Carnegie Hall as a jazz-like orchestral arrangement. A recording was made of Johnson performing the music on piano. A film inspired by the song was also made.

== Song name ==
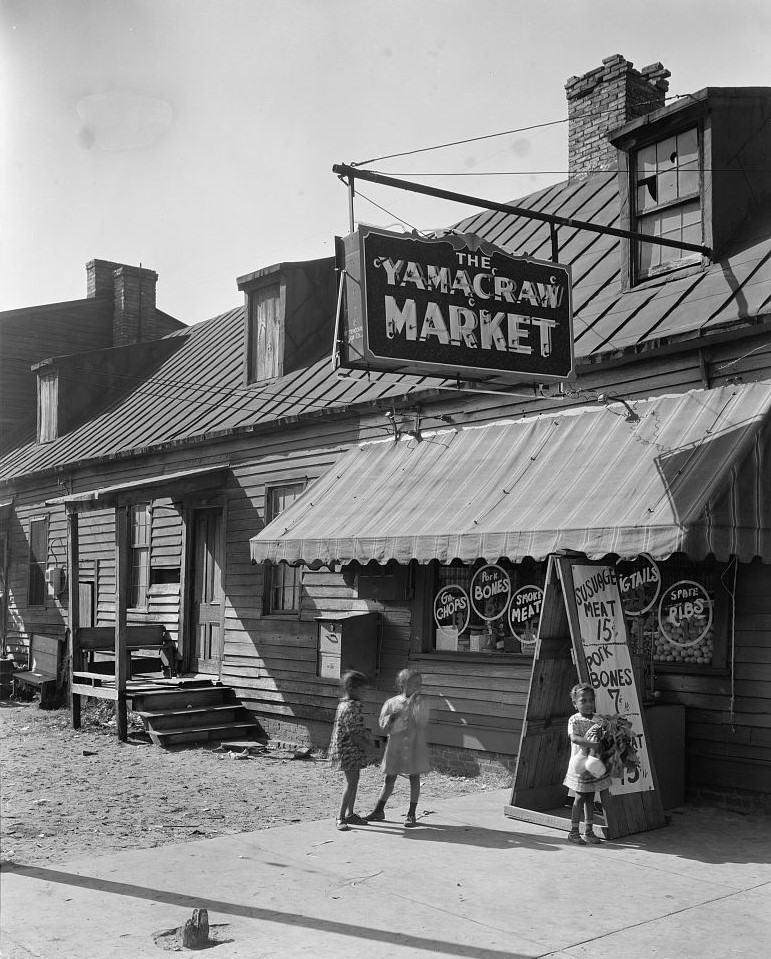
The Yamacraw Market on Fahm Street in Savannah circa 1940

Yamacraw was a black neighborhood in Savannah, Georgia. The song was inspired by the culture of the neighborhood, and billed as a more "authentic" rhapsody.

== Film ==
Murray Roth directed a short 1930 musical film inspired by the song. The film has been referred to by the title Yamekraw and Yamacraw. It is a Vitaphone Varieties film produced by Warner Brothers.

The film depicts a poor man from a rural area travelling to a large city where he encounters a dancer. Jimmy Mordecai portrayed the lead character. In the film, Yamekraw is described as a settlement outside Savannah, Georgia. The film was shown in 2009. The song is included on the album The Symphonic Jazz of James P. Johnson.

== See also ==
- Yamacraw Bluff
