= Engberg =

Engberg is a Scandinavian surname, meaning "meadow (äng) mountain". Notable people with the surname include:

- Arthur Engberg (1888–1944), Swedish politician
- Eric Engberg (1941-2016), American broadcast journalist
- Holger Engberg (1909–1993), Swedish ice hockey player
- Ida Engberg (born 1984), Swedish techno DJ
- Katrine Engberg (born 1975), Danish actress and novelist
- Lars Engberg (1943–2017), Danish politician
- Lotta Engberg (born 1963), Swedish singer
- Mary Davenport Engberg (1880–1951), American violinist, composer and conductor
- Siri Engberg (born 1967), American writer, curator, editor
- Susan Engberg (1940–2021), American novelist
- Torsten Engberg (1934–2018), Swedish Coastal Artillery officer

== See also ==
- Engberg Bluff, bold ice-covered bluff in Victoria Land
- Engdahl
- Englund
