= Seattle Civic Symphony Orchestra =

Seattle Civic Symphony Orchestra was an amateur and, for one season, a professional orchestra which held its first concert on April 24, 1921, and held its last concert on May 4, 1924. It was founded and directed by Mary Davenport Engberg.

Mary Davenport Engberg intended the orchestra to be a vehicle for "the schooling of instrumentalists in orchestral routine" for "developing orchestra players for the Seattle Symphony Orchestra from the ranks of local students" and modeled on the relationship of the Civic Orchestra of Chicago to the Chicago Symphony Orchestra as a training orchestra for the Seattle Symphony Orchestra. The Seattle Civic Symphony Orchestra made its debut two months after the professional Seattle Symphony Orchestra's final concert of the 1920-21 season on February 15, 1921. The Seattle Symphony Orchestra subsequently suffered financial problems. Over five months after the Seattle Civic Symphony Orchestra's first concert, the Seattle Symphony board announced that the Seattle Symphony's 1921-2 season was cancelled. The Seattle Civic Symphony Orchestra continued as a separate artistic venue, and its personnel initially contained only one musician belonging to the Seattle Symphony Orchestra listed with his first and last name reversed and no longer listed the following year. Unlike the professional Seattle Symphony Orchestra, the personnel of the Seattle Civic Symphony Orchestra received no compensation. Starting in the fall of 1921, rehearsals were held on Thursday evenings in the assembly room on the ninth floor of the Arctic Building in space made available by the Seattle Metropolitan Chamber of Commerce.

After three successful seasons, Mary Davenport Engberg announced her intention to transform the Seattle Civic Symphony Orchestra into a union orchestra in which the players were compensated. Compensation was apparently $8.00 per session. The orchestra thereafter boasted "21 musicians who played formerly in the Seattle Symphony Orchestra during its existence" out of a total of 62. Despite such a large representation of players, this statement implies that the Seattle Symphony Orchestra was still defunct. The Seattle Civic Symphony Orchestra was nevertheless able to attract violinist Efrem Zimbalist, Sr. to solo with the orchestra for its concert on November 25, 1923, and pianist Ossip Gabrilowitsch for its concert on May 4, 1924, both at the Metropolitan Theater. Despite these artistic successes, the May 4, 1924, concert marked the final appearance of the Seattle Civic Symphony Orchestra, apparently due to financial problems. The Seattle Symphony Orchestra was revived in 1926 under the direction of Karl Krueger after a five-year hiatus.

Despite subsequent embellishments that Mary Davenport Engberg was the Seattle Symphony Orchestra's first female conductor, she in fact was never the director of the Seattle Symphony Orchestra.
