= Klosterstræde 16 =

Four-storey building in Copenhagen, Denmark

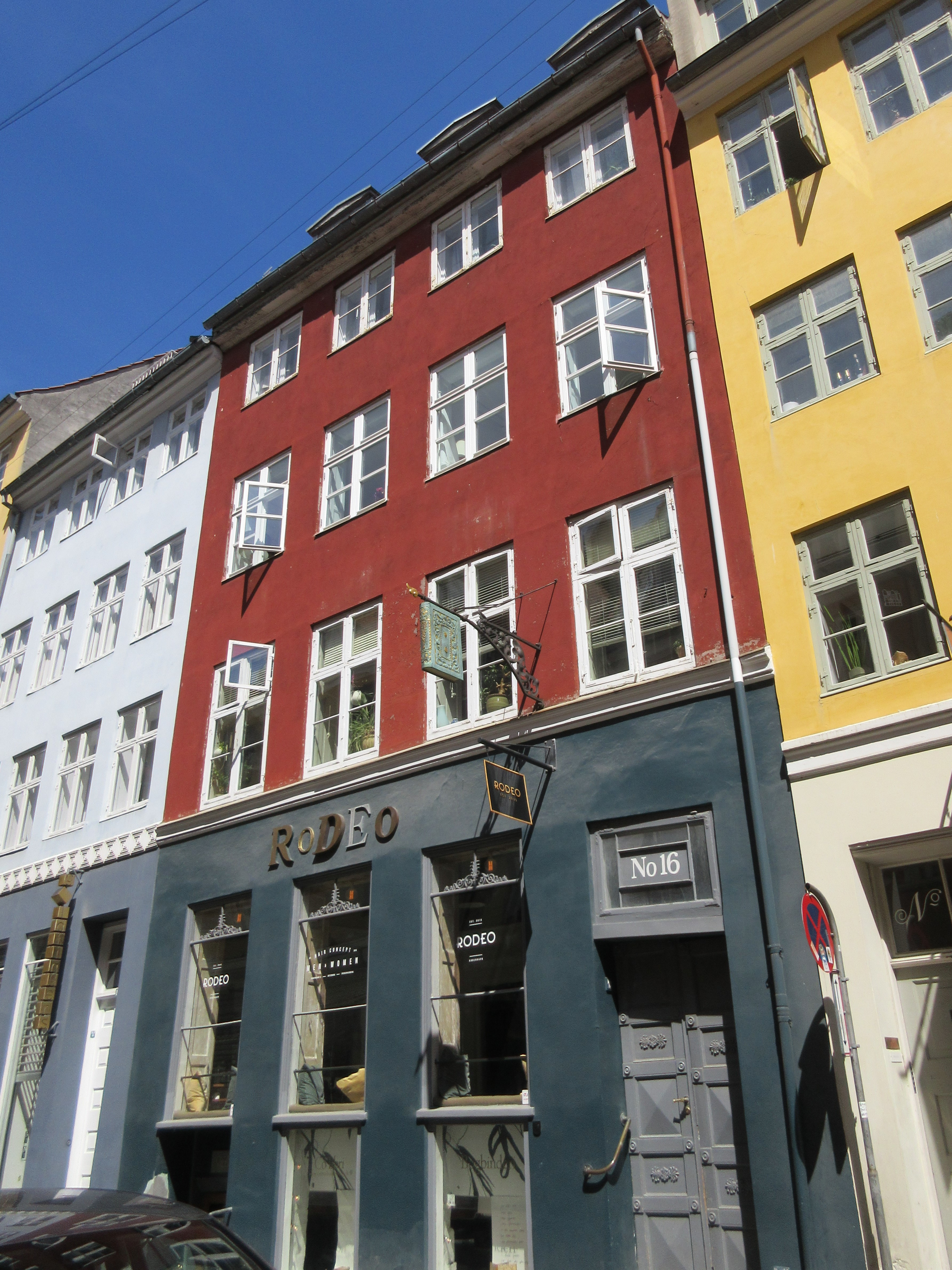
- Interactive map of the Klosterstræde 16 area

General information
- Location: Copenhagen, Denmark
- Coordinates: 55°40′45.16″N 12°34′31.55″E
- Completed: 18th century

Klosterstræde 16 is a four-storey building in the Old Town of Copenhagen, Denmark. It was listed in the Danish registry of protected buildings and places in 1992.

== History ==
=== Early history ===
The property was listed in Copenhagen's first cadastre from 1689 as No. 60 in Frimand's Quarter, owned by cantor Thorkild Andersen's widow at that time. The building was destroyed in the Copenhagen Fire of 1728, together with most of the other buildings in the area. The present building on the site was constructed with two storeys sometime between 1731 and 1734 for shoemaker Marquar Feltman.

=== Lund family ===
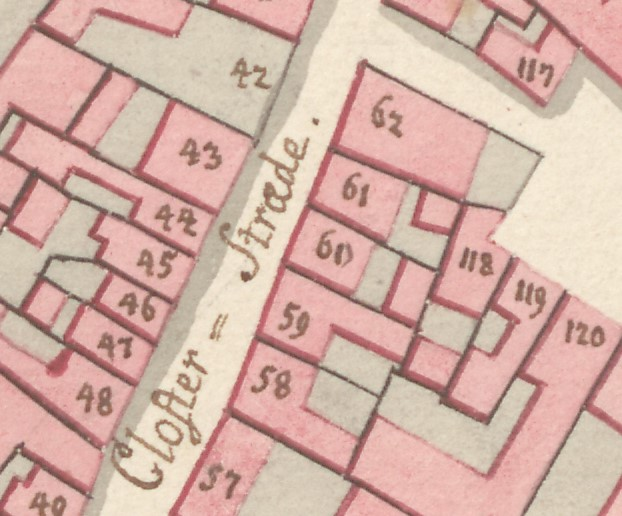
No. 59 seen in a detail from Christian Gedde's map of Frimand's Quarter

The property was listed in the new cadastre of 1756 as No. 59 in Frimand's Quarter, owned by Laurs Gregorius Lund. Between 1778 and 1793, it was heightened by two storeys for glovemaker Søren Jørgensen Lund.

The property was home to 16 residents in five households at the 1787 census. Søren Lund, a glovemaker and probably a son of the previous owner, resided in the building with his wife Marie Petersen, their two children (aged five and eight) and one maid. Fridk Toreum, a teacher (schoolholder), resided in the building with his wife Christine Weyhe and one maid. Jacob Lundgreen, a master tailor, resided in the building with his wife Else Marie Steenhrem and one maid. Henrich Jørgensen, another master tailor (frimester), resided in the building with his wife ane Magarethe Hildebrand and their 22-year-old son Severin. Jens Thoested, a beer seller (øltapper), resided in the building with one maid.

The property was home to 25 residents in five households at the 1801 census. Søren and Marie Elisabeth Lund resided in the building with their daughter Lucretia Lund, their son Jørgen Friderich Lund and one maid. Nicolai Biørn, a school teacher, resided in the building with his wife Rebekke Biørn, their two children (aged one and three), one maid and one lodger (clerk). Peter Skow, a retired royal lackey, resided in the building with his wife Christine Sophie Charlotte Skow and their nine-year-old daughter Ane Kirstine Skow. Karen Buleth, a widow needleworker, resided in the building with her six-year-old son Gustav Adolph Buleth. Aron Winge, a hairdresser, resided in the building with his wife Birgitte Cathrine Winge, their two-year-old son Johan Thomas Imanuel Winge and six lodgers.

The property was later passed to Lund's son Jørgen. His property was listed in the new cadastre of 1806 as No. 87 in Frimand's Quarter.

=== 20th century ===
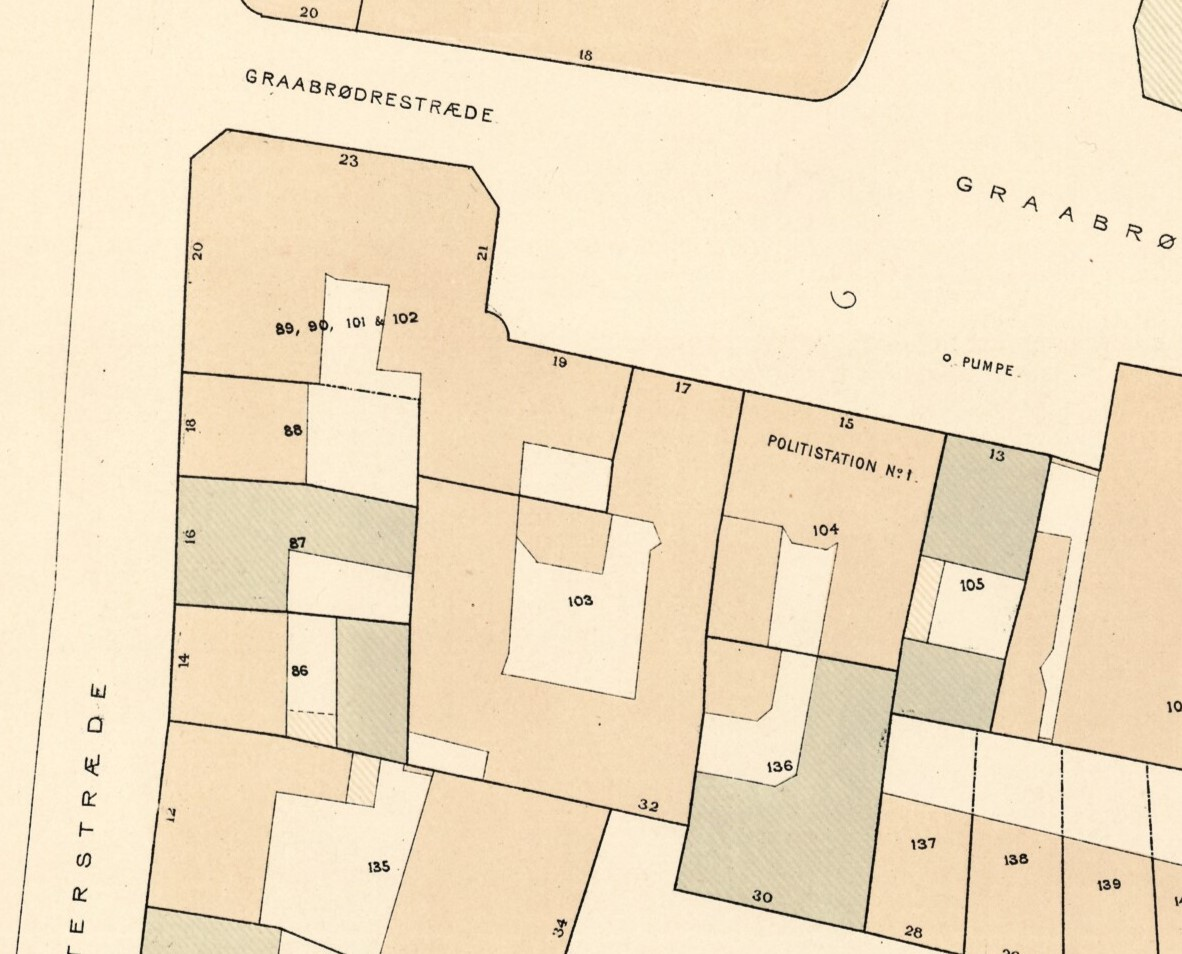
Klosterstræde 16 seen in a detail from one of Berggreen's block plans of Frimand's Quarter, 1886–88

The building was listed on the Danish registry of protected buildings and places in 1992.

== Today ==
Co'libri, a bookbindery, is based in the basement.

== Cultural references ==
In Katrine Engberg's 2016 crime novel The Tenant, the first book in her Copenhagen series, a young woman is discovered brutally murdered in one of the apartments at Klosterstræde 16.
