= Klosterstræde 21 =

Building in Copenhagen, Denmark

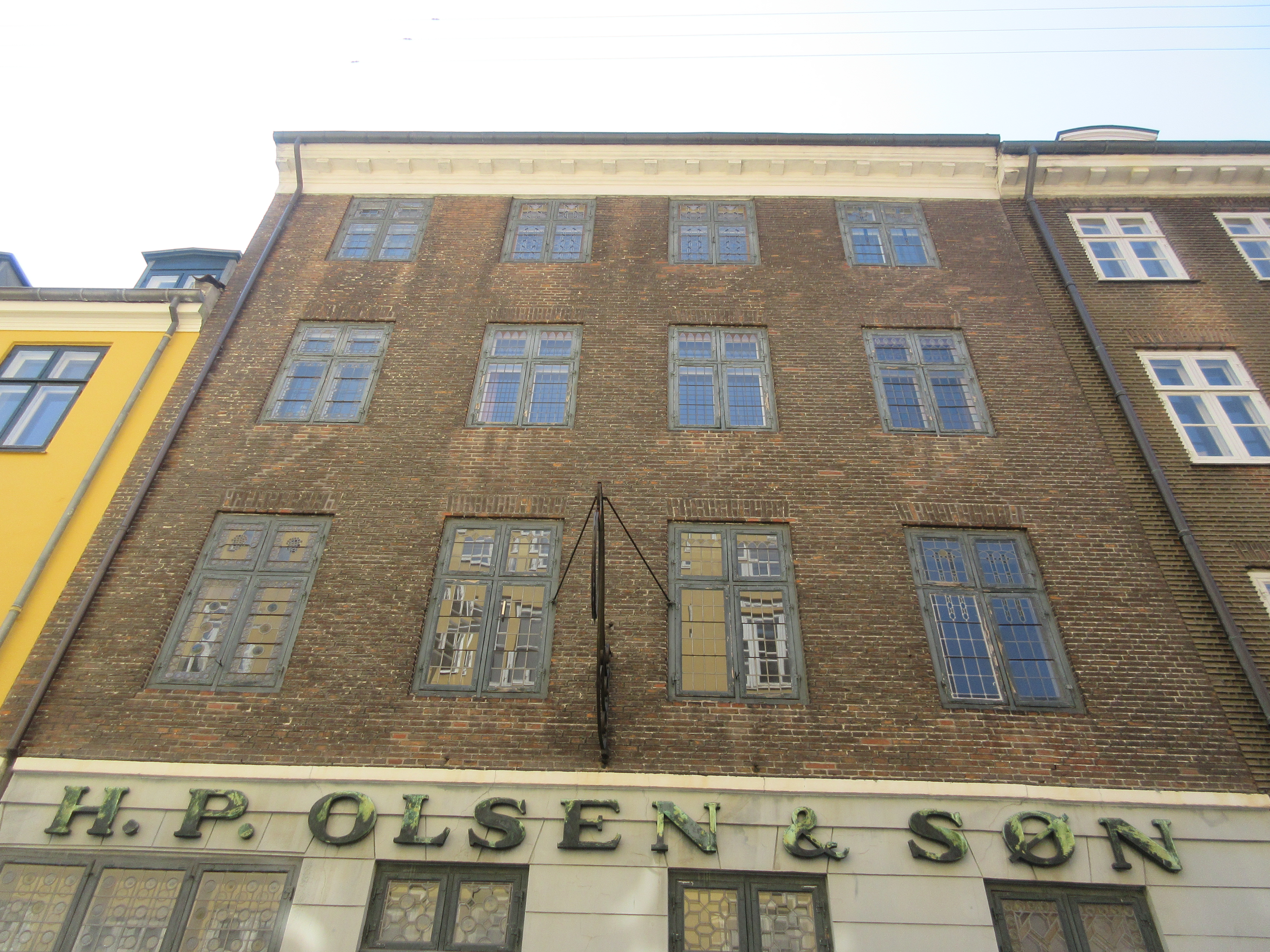
- Interactive map of the Klosterstræde 21 area

General information
- Location: Copenhagen, Denmark
- Coordinates: 55°40′45.41″N 12°34′30.18″E
- Renovated: 1817

Klosterstræde 21 is a four-storey building in the Old Town of Copenhagen, Denmark. It has since its completion in 1817 been home to a glazier's business. The current owner, H. P. Plsem & Søn, which has been based in the building since 1938, has replaced all the windows with antique stained glass windows. The building was listed on the Danish registry of protected buildings and places in 1950.

== History ==
=== Early history ===
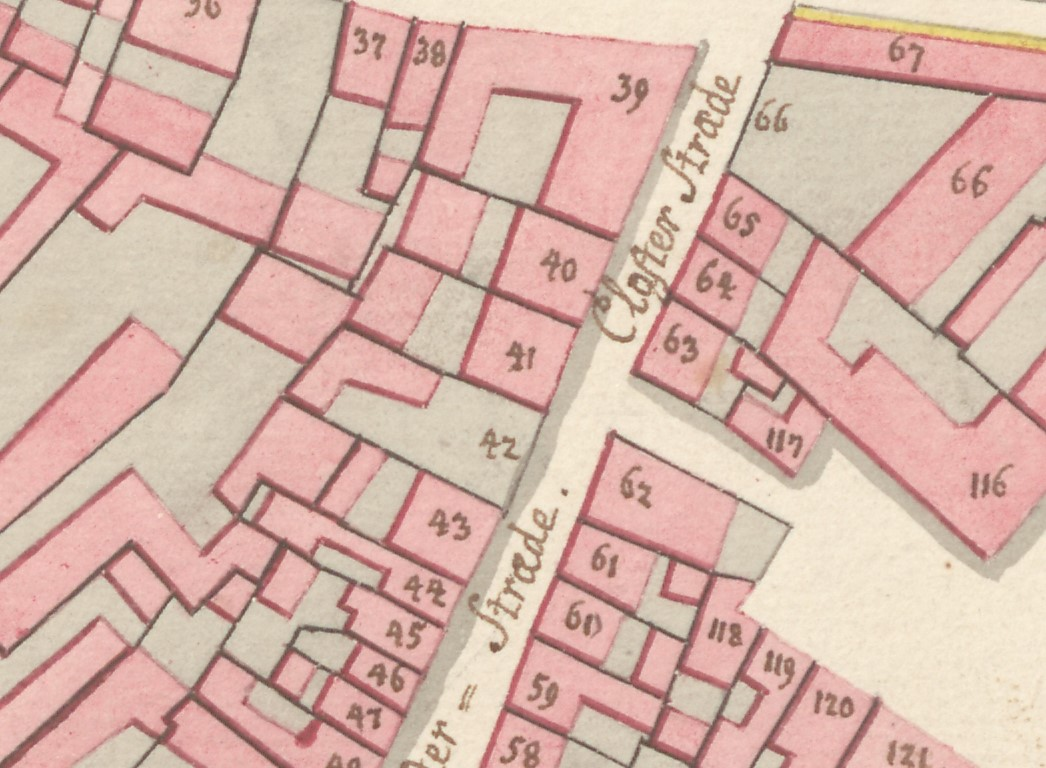
No. 42 seen on a detail from Christian Gedde's map of Frimand's Quarter.

The site was formerly made up of two small properties. One of the properties was listed in Copenhagen's first cadastre of 1689 as No. 51, owned by Peder Olsen. The other property was listed as No. 52 in Frimand's Quarter, owned by Johan Albertsen. The two properties were both destroyed during the Copenhagen Fire of 1728, together with most of the other buildings in the area. The two fire sites were subsequently merged into a single property. The property was listed in the new cadastre of 1756 as No. 42 in Frimand's Quarter, owned by roofer (blåtækker) Peder Jensen.

No. 42 was home to 30 residents in four households at the 1787 census. Jens Christian Hoestrup, a dustukker, resided in the building with his wife Mette Hald, their seven-year-old son Peder Hoestrup, one male servant and two maids. Diderich vonBraes, a captain in the King's Regiment, resided in the building with his wife CAroline Bratke, their four children (aged one to 10), 22-year-old Carine Rosow, one male servant, one wet nurse and one maid. Aron Fürst, a Jewish merchant, resided in the building with his wife Marie, their six children (aged 10 to 20( and the lodger Pillip Wallich. Peter Brick, a royal stableman, resided, resided in the building with his wife Anne Niels Datter, their two children (aged one and five) and one maid.

The property was home to 33 residents in four households at the 1801 census. Elias Christensen Meelbye, a distiller, resided in the building with his wife Ane Kirstine Meelbye, their 11-year-old son Elias Melbye, one male servant, one maid and one lodger. Teii Taud, a teacher at Our Lady's School, resided in the building with his wife Ulriche Schule, their seven children (aged two to 18) and one maid. Peter Jacobsen, a beer seller, resided in the building with his wife Marie Heim, jis mother-in-law Kirstine Lys and one lodger. Marcus Levin Hartvig, a merchant (kommissionær), resided in the building with his wife Johanne Hartvig, their 10 children (aged two to 15) and his mother Levin Hartvig.

=== Fischer and the new building ===
Peter Christian Weinreich Fischer (1772–1834) established a glazier's business at the site on 20 June 1796. The adjacent building at Klosterstræde 23 was constructed for him in 1811–12. Klosterstræde 21 was constructed for him in 1814–1817 and he subsequently ran his glazier's business from the premises. Finnur Magnússon, who then worked for the King's private archives, was from 1827 and until his death ten years later also among the residents in the building.

The building and firm was, after the founder's death, handed down to his son, Peter Didrik Weinreich Fischer (1813–1884). His property was home to 33 residents at the 1840 census. Peter Diederik Heinrich Fischer resided on the first floor with a glazier and a glazier's apprentice. The Icelandic scholar Finnur Magnússon, who had just divorced his wife, resided on the same floor with his housekeeper Karen Christensen Embacher and one maid. Anna Kierstine Sactmann (née Leth), a widow with a pension, resided on the second floor with four children aged 21 to 26) and two lodgers (student and widow). Søren Moritz Fedor von Høyer, a fired army captain, resided on the third floor with his wife Marthe Marie født Knutzen, their four children (aged eight to 22) and two lodgers (theologian and medicine student). Else Cathrine Fischer, a widow, resided on the ground floor with three unmarried daughters (aged 32 to 36) and a maid. Frederik Adam Gyesen, a manufacturer of smoked food, resided in the basement with his wife Marie Kirstine Gyesen (mée Gerner) and their 14-year-old daughter Frigine Marie Gyesen. Hans Wohlrat Holm, a master painter, resided on the second floor of the rear wing. Heinrich Kristian Meyer, a saddler, resided on the third floor of the rear wing with his wife Sophie Amalie født Beker and their one-year-old daughter.

Fischer served as alderman for the Glaziers' Guild in 1845–47 and again in 1851–53. He had by Frederick VII been commissioned to create four glass paintings for Christian IV's Chapel at Roskilde Cathedral. They were never used as originally intended but two of them can now be seen in Frederiksborg Chapel. The two others were destroyed in the fire of Christiansborg Palace in 1884.

=== Wriedt family ===
In 1871, Fuscher sold the family business to A. W. C. K. Wriedt (1833–1907). Wriedt's son, Ludwig Wriedt (b. 1879), took over the operations in 1904 .

=== H. P. Olsen & Søn ===
On 1 December 1938, it was acquired by a competitor, H. P. Olsen & Søn, a firm founded on 1 January 1891 by 1891 by Hans Peter Olsen (1863–1935). It has until then been located first at Hyskenstræde 14 and then (from 1932) at Kompagnistræde 2. Olsen's son Robert Hermann Bodholt Olsen (b. 1895) was from 1922 the sole owner of the company. His son, Hermann Arne Bodholt Olsen (b. 1920), was made a partner in 1943.

== Architecture ==
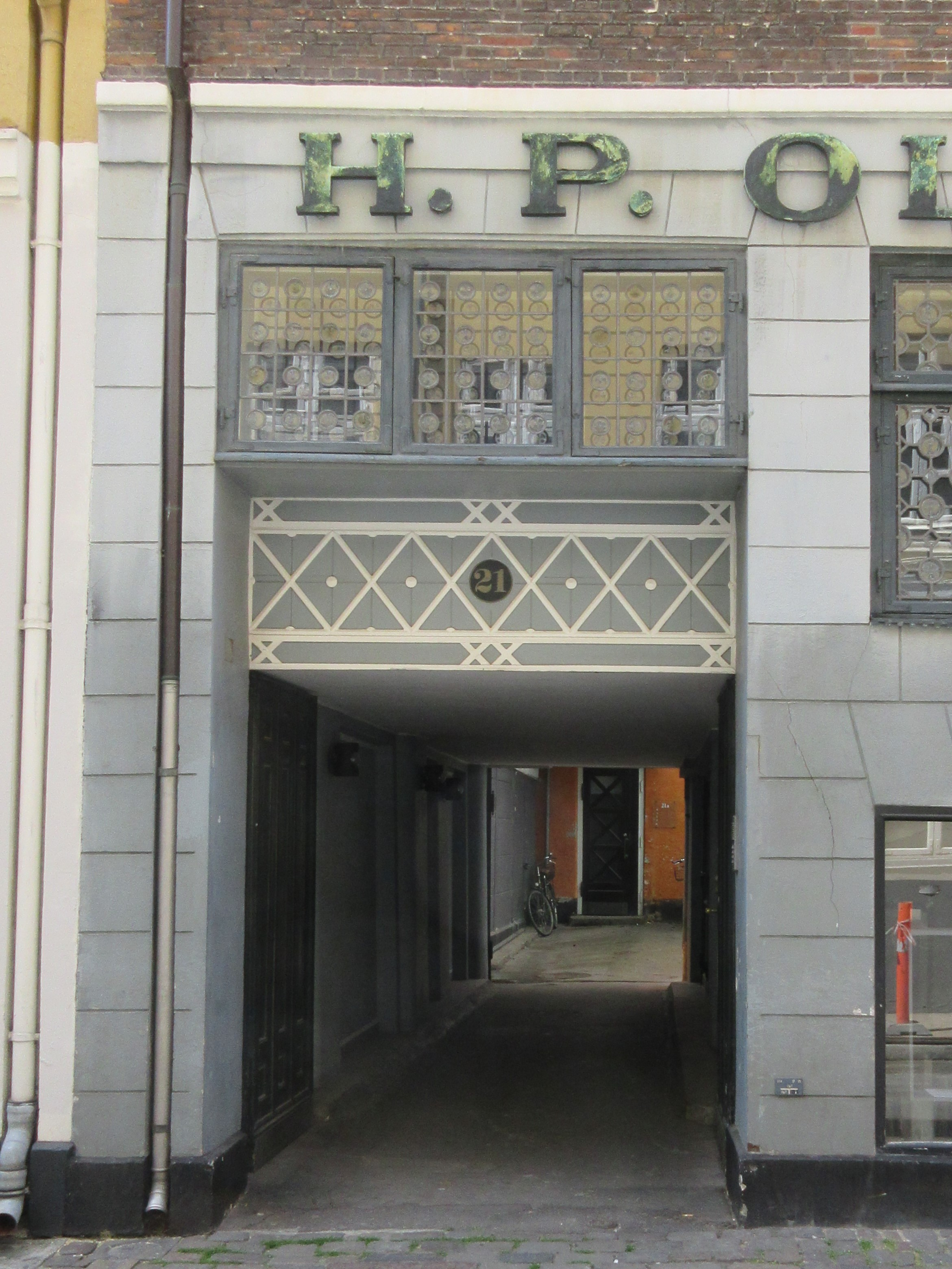
The gate

The building consists of four storeys over a raised cellar and is four bays wide. The facade is dressed in a grey colour on the ground floor and cellar while the rest stands in undressed, red brick. All the windows have by H. P. Olsen & Søn been replaced by antique stained glass windows from other buildings in Copenhagen, none of which are identical. The name of the company is written in copper lettering above the windows of the ground flor. Mounted on the facade between the two central windows of the first floor is an old rough iron sign. The gate in the left-hand side of the building opens to a small courtyard. A door in the wall of the gateway provides access to the main staircase of the building. The building was listed on the Danish registry of protected buildings and places in 1950.

== Today ==
H. P. Olsen & Co. is based in the ground floor and cellar. A single apartment occupies each of the upper floors.

== Gallery ==
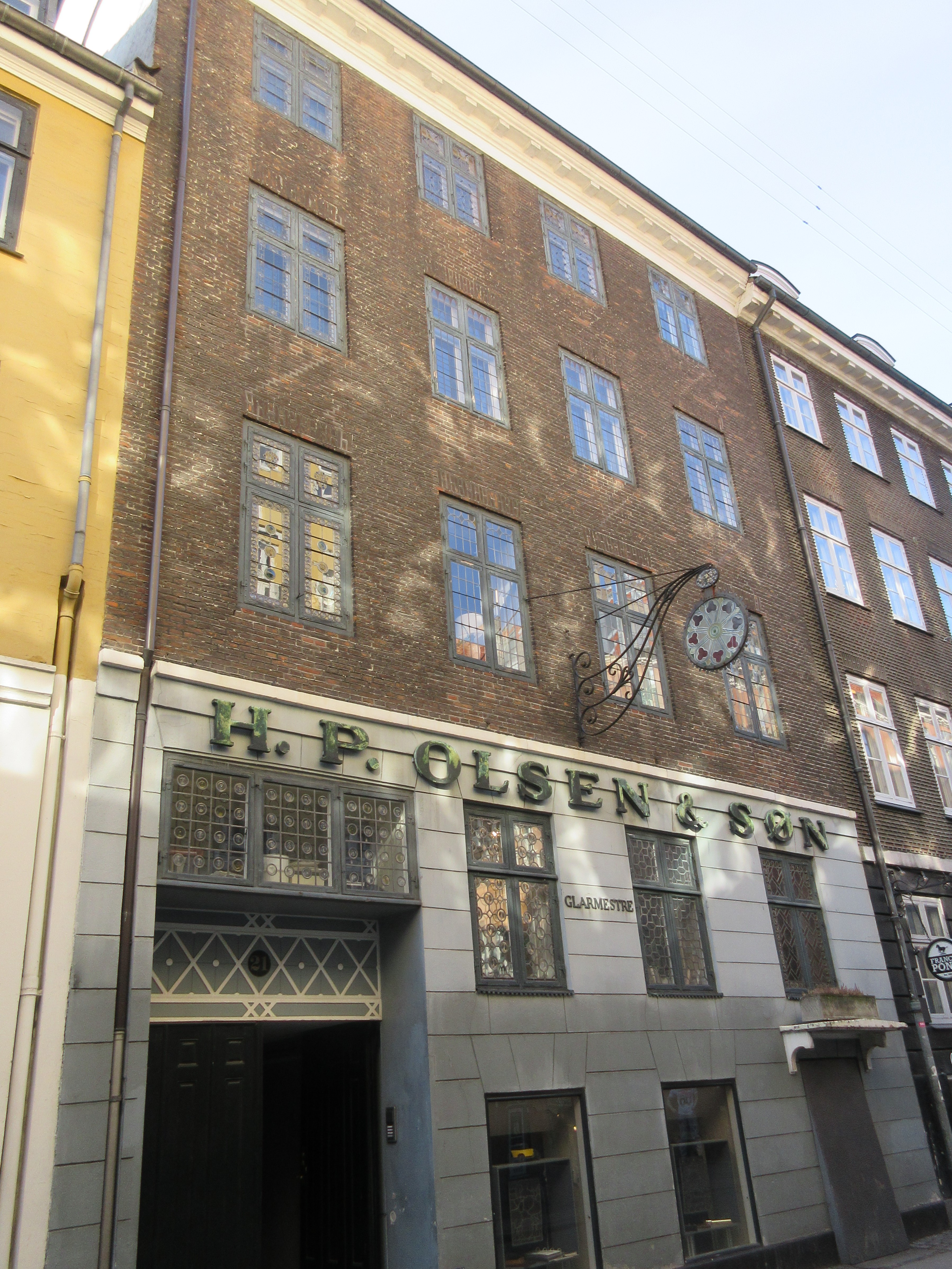
Klosterstræde 21.

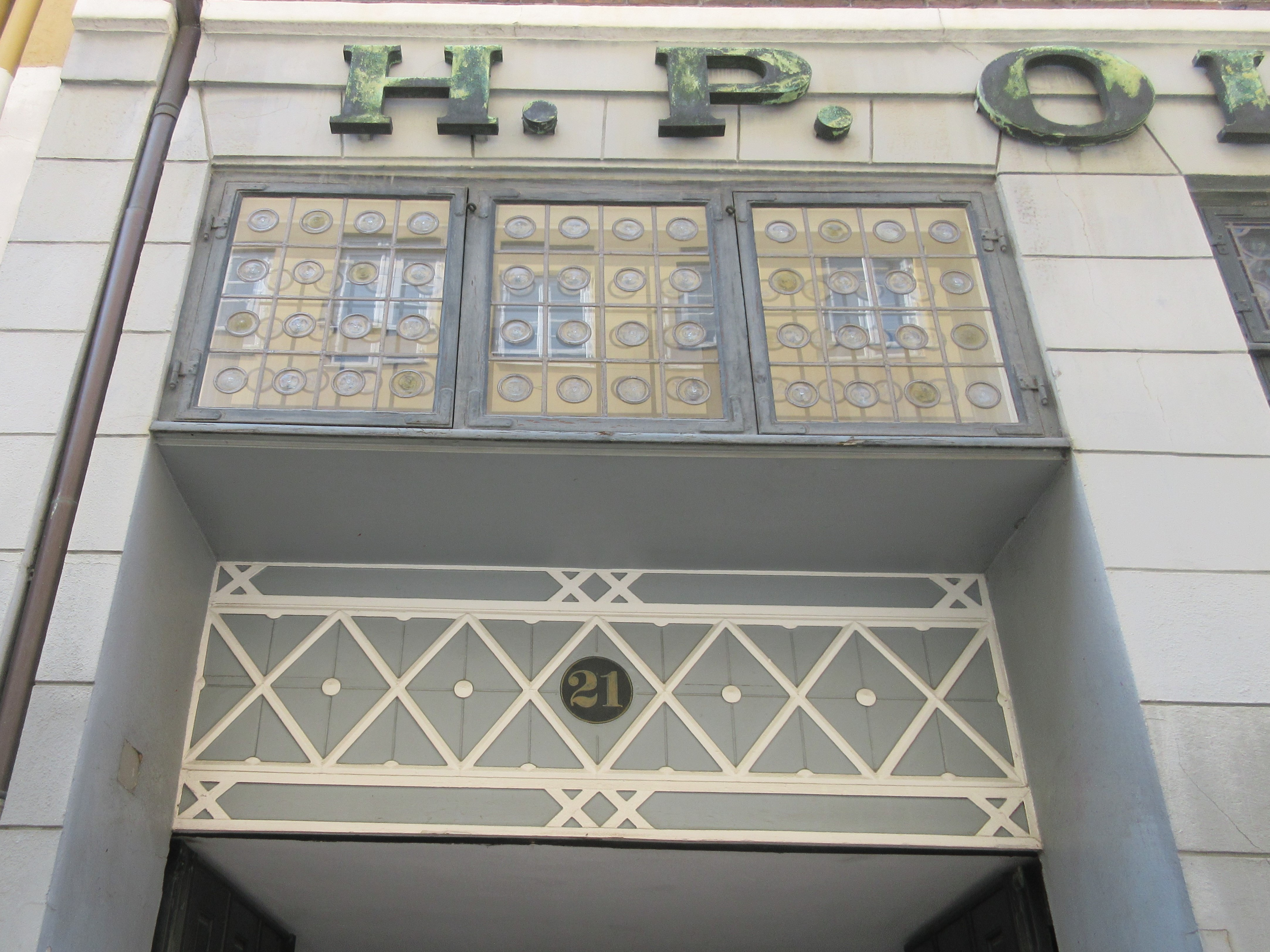
Detail of the gate

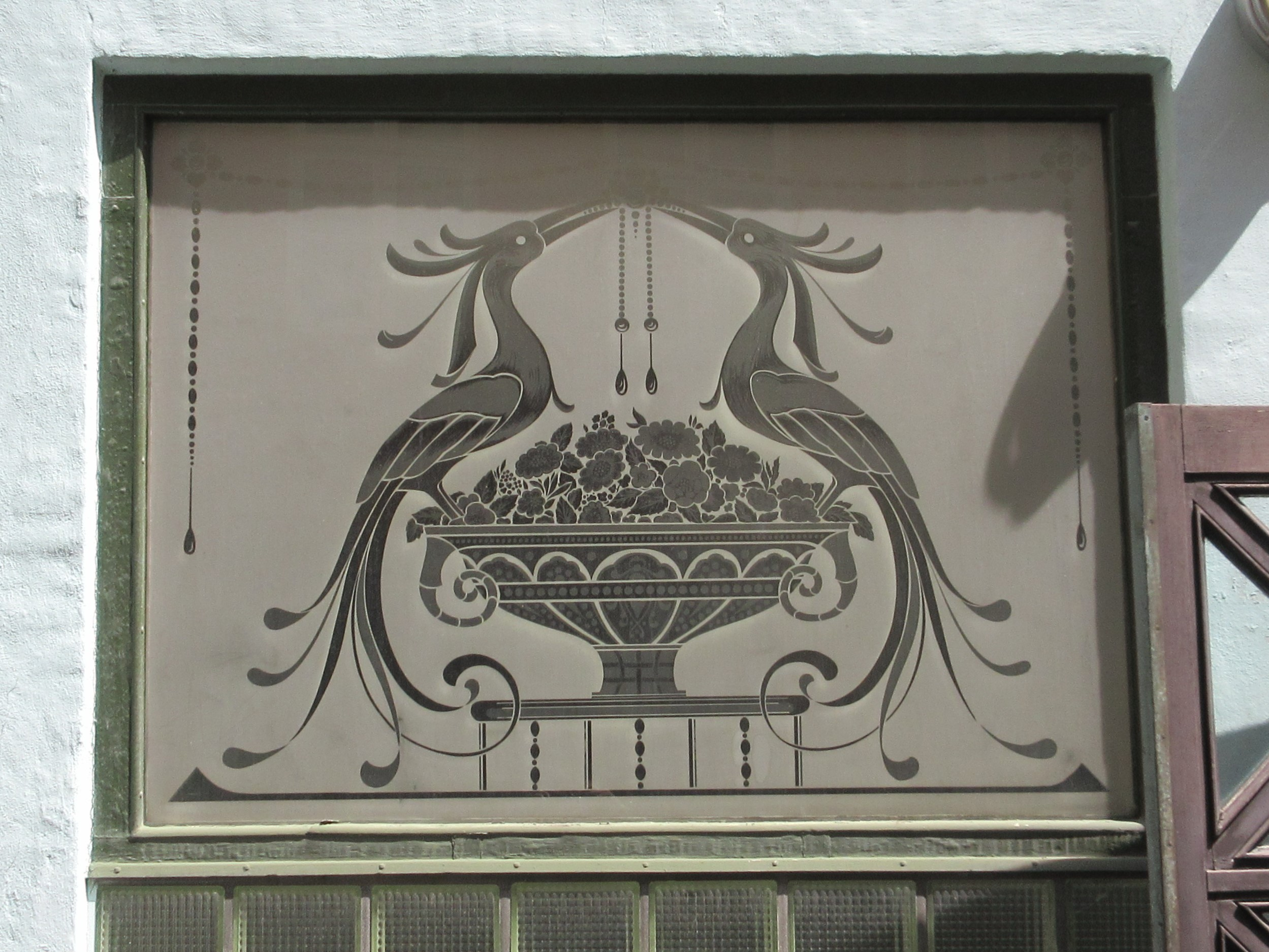
Decoration on the rear side of the building

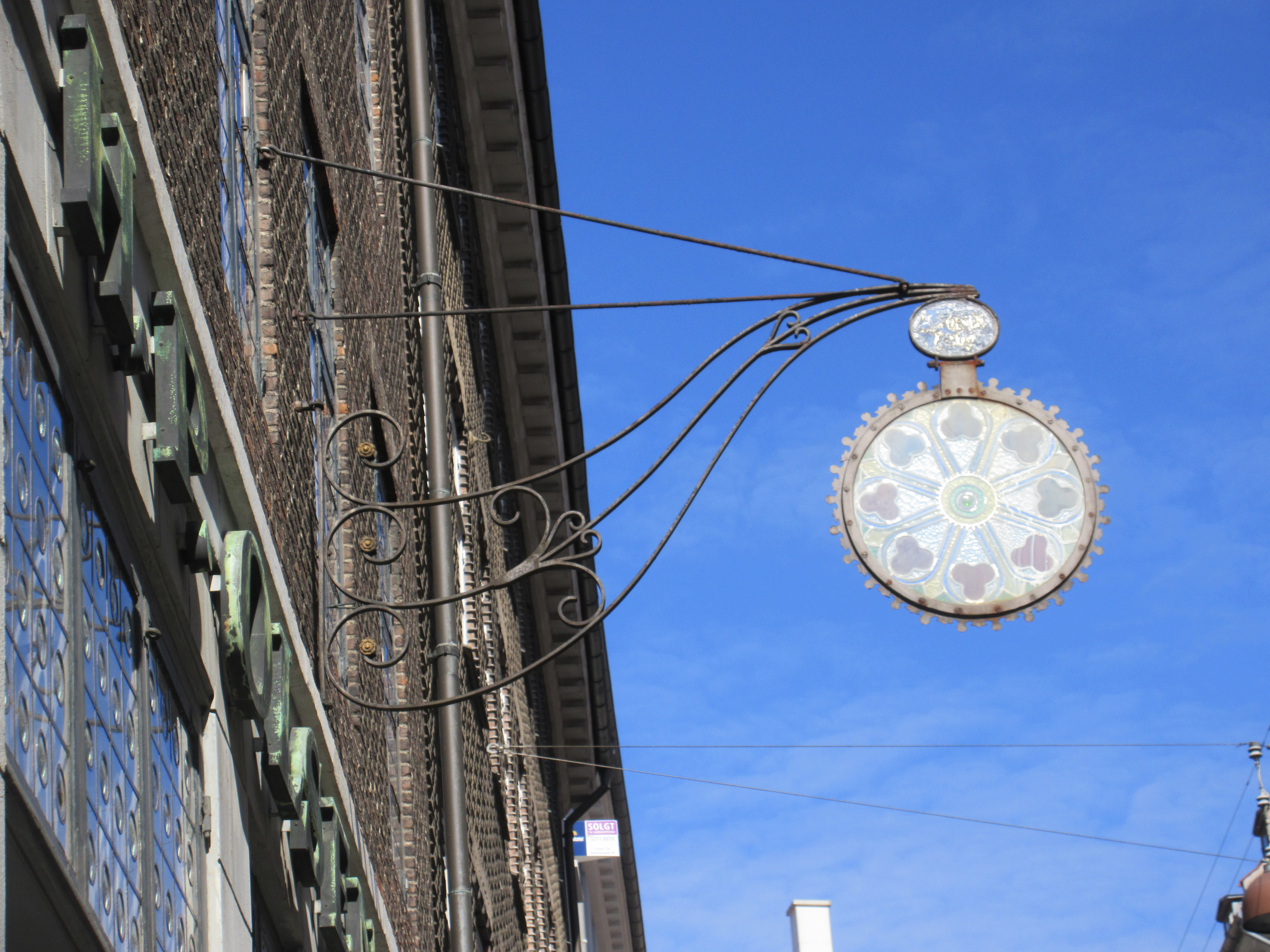
Sign

== See also ==
- Sværtegade 3
