= Afro-American Symphony =

Symphony by William Grant Still

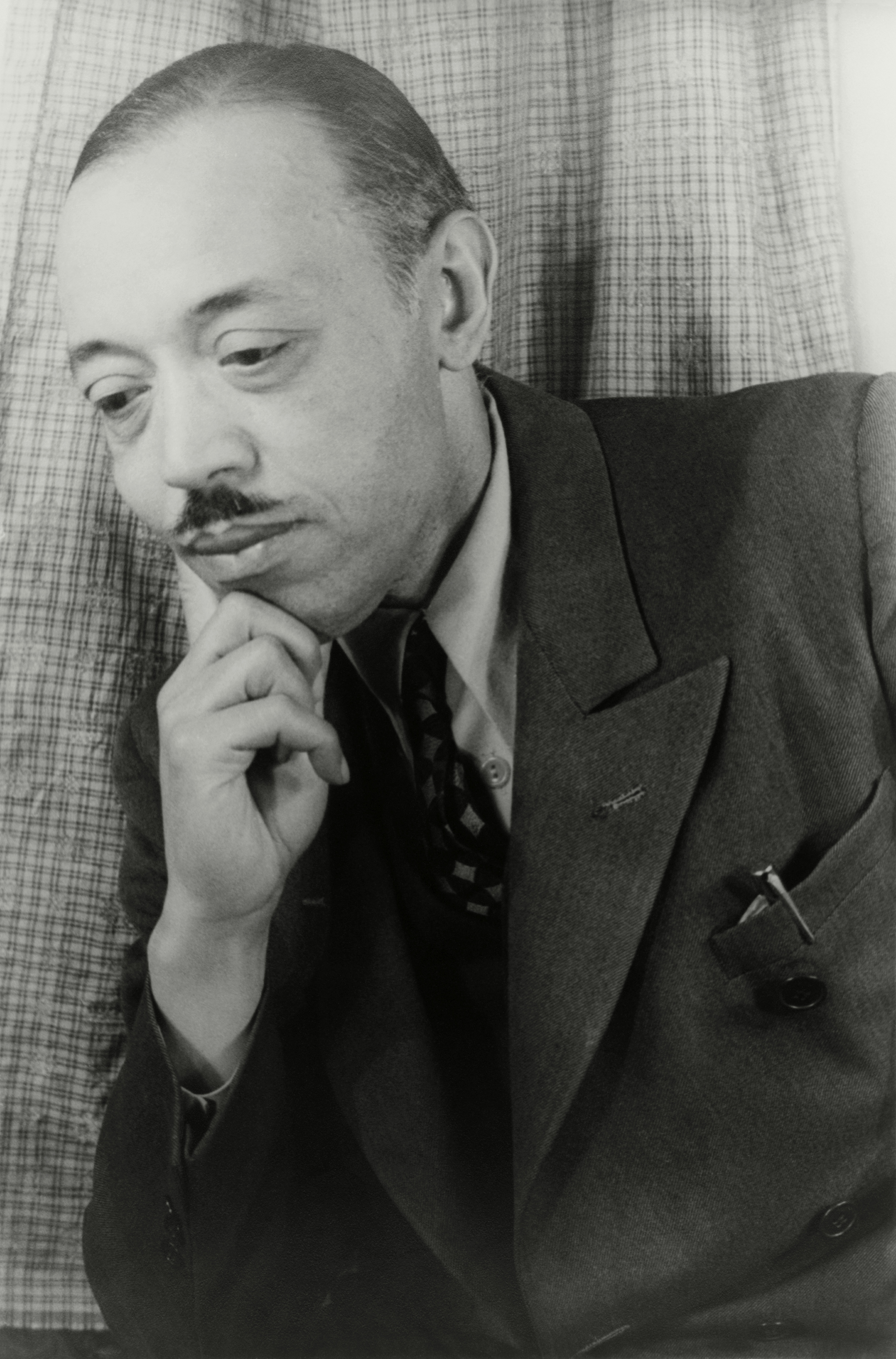
William Grant Still in 1949, photographed by Carl Van Vechten

Afro-American Symphony, also known as Symphony No. 1 "Afro-American" and Symphony No. 1 in A♭ major, is a 1930 composition by William Grant Still, the first symphony written by an African American and performed for a United States audience by a leading orchestra. It was premiered in 1931 by the Rochester Philharmonic Orchestra and later published in 1935. It is a symphonic piece for full orchestra, including celeste, harp, and tenor banjo. It combines a fairly traditional symphonic form with blues progressions and rhythms that were characteristic of popular African-American music at the time. Still used quotes from four poems by early 20th-century African-American poet Paul Laurence Dunbar as epigraphs for each symphonic movement. The symphony is about twenty-four minutes long.

== History ==
Still composed the Afro-American Symphony over 3 months, during which he had no steady work. Sketches (1924) for the symphony, including a layout of its four movements, are found in a journal which Still was using to collect material for an opera called Rashana, which he never finished. In his journal, Still wrote:

I seek in the 'Afro-American Symphony' to portray not the higher type of colored American, but the sons of the soil, who still retain so many of the traits peculiar to their African forebears; who have not responded completely to the transforming effect of progress.

Although he had received instruction from (among others) the French modernist composer Edgard Varèse, Still used a traditional tonal idiom in the Afro-American Symphony, infused with blues-inspired melodic lines and harmonic colorings.

== Movements ==
=== I. Moderato assai ===
The first movement, moderato assai (very moderate), contains a typical twelve-bar blues progression. Still titled this movement 'Longing' in his notebook.

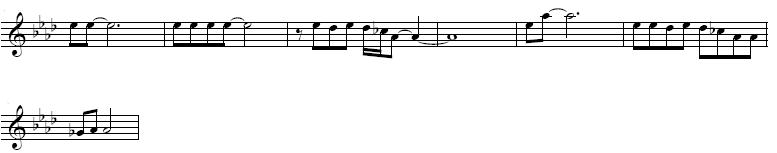
Main theme in original outline in "Rashana"

This opening theme (which Gershwin's "Summertime' resembles) (how?) expands into the first of two main themes of the movement, and it returns various times throughout the first, second, and third movements. This theme – theme 1 – shown below, is first played by the trumpet and uses classic blues harmonies and melodic progressions.

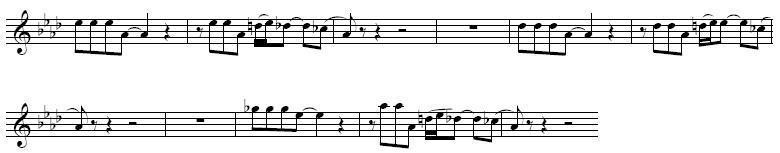
Theme 1 - Trumpet (Harmon mute)

Theme 1 repeats at measure 19, this time played by the clarinet, and the flutes interrupt each small phrase within the theme with their own counter-melody that contrasts with the theme in its straight (not swung) rhythms. Still then takes small motifs of theme 1 and develops them, transitioning into theme 2, in G major, played by the oboe, starting at measure 45. Theme 2 continues to develop, and its melody returns with the cello section. The ending motifs of theme 2 expand into a loud exciting march-like development section with the snare drum that contrasts with both themes in that it is very rhythmical. This section leads right back to theme 2, but this time in a minor key. The minor key gives this section a much more longing and lamenting feeling. The lamenting mood does not last very long, as theme 1 returns shortly after, ending the movement.

Each movement is accompanied by excerpts from four poems by Paul Laurence Dunbar, who used Negro dialect in these. The quotations are used as epigraphs for each movement and illustrate Still's intentions in composing the symphony. The epigraph for Movement 1 is from Dunbar's "Twell de Night Is Pas'":

All de night long twell de moon goes down,
Lovin' I set at huh feet,
Den fu' de long jou'ney back f'om de town,
Ha'd, but de dreams mek it sweet.

The end of the first movement is accompanied with the following quote:

All my life long twell de night has pas'
Let de wo'k come ez it will,
So dat I fin' you, my honey, at last,
Somewhaih des ovah de hill.

=== II. Adagio ===
The second movement, adagio (meaning broadly and slow), titled "Sorrow" in Still's "Rashana" notebook, contains related themes from the first movement, but in a spiritual style. The movement is more chromatic than the first and employs less functional chord progressions. The epigraph of the second movement is from "W'en I Gits Home," and reflects the spiritual melody:

It's moughty tiahsome layin' 'roun'
Dis sorer-laden erfly groun',
An' oftentimes I thinks, thinks I,
'T would be a sweet t'ing des to die,
An go 'long home.

=== III. Animato ===
The third movement, Animato was assigned the title "Humor" by Still in "Rashana." The key center for this movement is again A♭. The movement has two major themes, each with two prevailing variations. In measure eight, theme 1A, "Hallelujah," begins (shown below).

Theme 1A

This theme is accompanied by a counter-melody in the horns which resembles Gershwin's "I Got Rhythm" (this premiered on October 14, 1930). The counter-melody is expressed by the horns in measures 8–11 and by the flute and oboe in measures 12–15.

Gershwin Theme from "I Got Rhythm", played by Horns

Theme 2A (shown below) is played by a mixture of low strings and winds (i.e. cello, trombone, etc.) and contrasts with theme 1 in that it is fanfare-like; it interrupts theme 1 whenever it comes in.

Theme 2A

This movement, when performed by the Kansas City Philharmonic under Karl Krueger in 1938, had such an effect on the audience and musicians that Krueger had to interrupt the concert and repeat the movement.

This movement is based on the poem, "An Ante-Bellum Sermon" by Dunbar, which is about emancipation and citizenship of the blacks in America. The lines quoted by Still in the score are as follows:

An' we'll shout ouah halleluyahs,
On dat mighty reck'nin' day.

=== IV. Lento, con risoluzione ===
The fourth movement, lento, con risoluzione, or as Still titled it in "Rashana," "Aspiration," begins with a hymn-like section, and continues on in a modal fashion, eventually ending with an upbeat and lively finale. This movement, ultimately in F minor, avoids traditional progressions from the dominant to the tonic (V-I). The opening contains no suggestion of modulation and has no authentic cadences, producing a sense of ambiguity of the tonic. The slow modal sections that follow the opening are centered on E natural, so by the time these slow sections are interrupted by passages in F minor, the use of E natural as a leading tone has been downplayed. In the finale, a V to I progression is avoided entirely, and the bass moves from an F to a D♭, resembling Dvořák's New World Symphony.

The following epigraph, from Dunbar's poem "Ode to Ethiopia," follows with the fourth movement:

Be proud, my Race, in mind and soul,
Thy name is writ on Glory's scroll
In characters of fire.
High 'mid the clouds of Fame's bright sky,
Thy banner's blazoned folds now fly,
And truth shall lift them higher.

== Instrumentation ==
The score of Still's Afro-American Symphony calls for:

- 3 flutes (third doubling piccolo)
- 2 oboes
- English Horn
- 3 clarinets
- bass clarinet
- 2 bassoons
- 4 horns
- 3 trumpets
- 3 trombones
- tuba
- timpani
- percussion
  - vibraphone
  - triangle
  - wire brush
  - small cymbal
  - cymbals
  - snare drum
  - bass drum
  - woodblock
  - orchestra bells
  - gong
- harp
- celesta
- tenor banjo
- strings (violin 1, violin 2, viola, cello, double bass)

== See also ==
- List of jazz-influenced classical compositions
- Maurice Arnold Strothotte
