= Engdahl =

Engdahl is a surname, meaning ‘meadow (äng) valley (dahl)’, and may refer to:

- Emma Engdahl-Jägerskiöld (1852–1930), Finnish opera singer
- F. William Engdahl (born 1944), American economist and writer
- Horace Engdahl (born 1948), Swedish literary historian and critic
- J. Louis Engdahl (1884–1932), American radical journalist
- Knut Engdahl (born 1933), Norwegian politician
- Nils Engdahl (1898–1983), Swedish athlete
- Per Engdahl (1909–1994), Swedish Neo-Nazi politician
- Sylvia Engdahl (born 1933), American science fiction writer
- Cody C. Engdahl (born 1971), American historical novelist

== See also ==
- Engberg
- Englund
