= Engsund =

Engsund is a Swedish surname. Notable people with the surname include:

- Filiph Engsund (born 1993) is a Swedish professional ice hockey player
- Lars Engsund (born 1968), Swedish politician
- Ludvig Engsund (born 1993), Swedish ice hockey goaltender
- Oscar Engsund (born 1993), Swedish ice hockey defenceman

== See also ==
- Englund
