= Debra Hand =

Artist and sculptor from Chicago, Illinois

Debra Hand is a self-taught artist and sculptor from Chicago, Illinois.

== Biography ==
Hand first publicly unveiled her work at the DuSable Museum of African American History.

The unveiling was arranged by the museum's principal founder, Margaret Taylor-Burroughs who took a personal interest in Hand's work and showcased her during Burrough's historic Lifetime in the Arts retrospective exhibit at the museum. It was during this occasion that she invited Hand on stage and introduced her to an audience of art patrons and dignitaries as an emerging-artist with great potential; one that they should watch for on Chicago's fine-art scene.

Since the museum presentation, Hand's rise to prominence has continued steadily. Her work can be found in diverse collections ranging from museum collections such as the Smithsonian Anacostia Community Museum – which acquired a cello by Hand – to corporate and private collections.

Hand's body of work is noted for its contemporary and figurative sculptures, dancers, musicians, and stringed instruments. The collection of stringed instruments titled "Strings Attached' was created after she was given a real violin by the Illinois Philharmonic Orchestra and challenged to use it as a canvas for a work of art.

Hand's sculptures, paintings and stringed instruments have been filmed by every major network in Chicago and in 2005 she was featured by Harry Porterfield of WLS-TV, as "Someone You Should Know." Her work has also been featured in Curators of Culture, an Emmy-Award-winning documentary by producer Rita Coburn Whack. The film traces the history of the South Side Community Art Center (SSCAC), one of Chicago's great art institutions. The SSCAC, like the DuSable Museum in Chicago, was also cofounded by Margaret Taylor-Burroughs who stood alongside Eleanor Roosevelt (wife of President Franklin D. Roosevelt) as the ribbons were cut to this great Works Progress Administration institution. In 2010, when the SSCAC decided to honor Anne "Anna" Roosevelt, the granddaughter of Theodore Roosevelt and Eleanor Roosevelt, along with her grandparents, posthumously, the SSCAC chose Hand to create and present the award sculpture at the Harris Theater in Chicago during the SSCAC's 70th anniversary celebration and their commissioned performance of "Off The Walls and Onto the Stage."

She created a bronze statue of the poet Paul Laurence Dunbar after receiving a commission to do so from the Chicago Park District in 2012. The statue, which is 9 feet (2.7 m) tall, was unveiled at the city's Dunbar Park in 2014.

Works by Hand can be found in collections such as that of the DuSable Museum, the Smithsonian Institution Anacostia Museum, the United Negro College Fund and the Plaze Club located atop the Prudential Building in downtown Chicago. Works by Hand also appear in many publications including "The Art of Culture - Evolution of Visual Art by African-American Artists" published by the Africa International House, "African Art: The Diaspora and Beyond" by author Daniel Parker, DTEX publishing; and in nationally distributed magazines.
