= Klosterstræde 23 =

Building in Copenhagen, Denmark

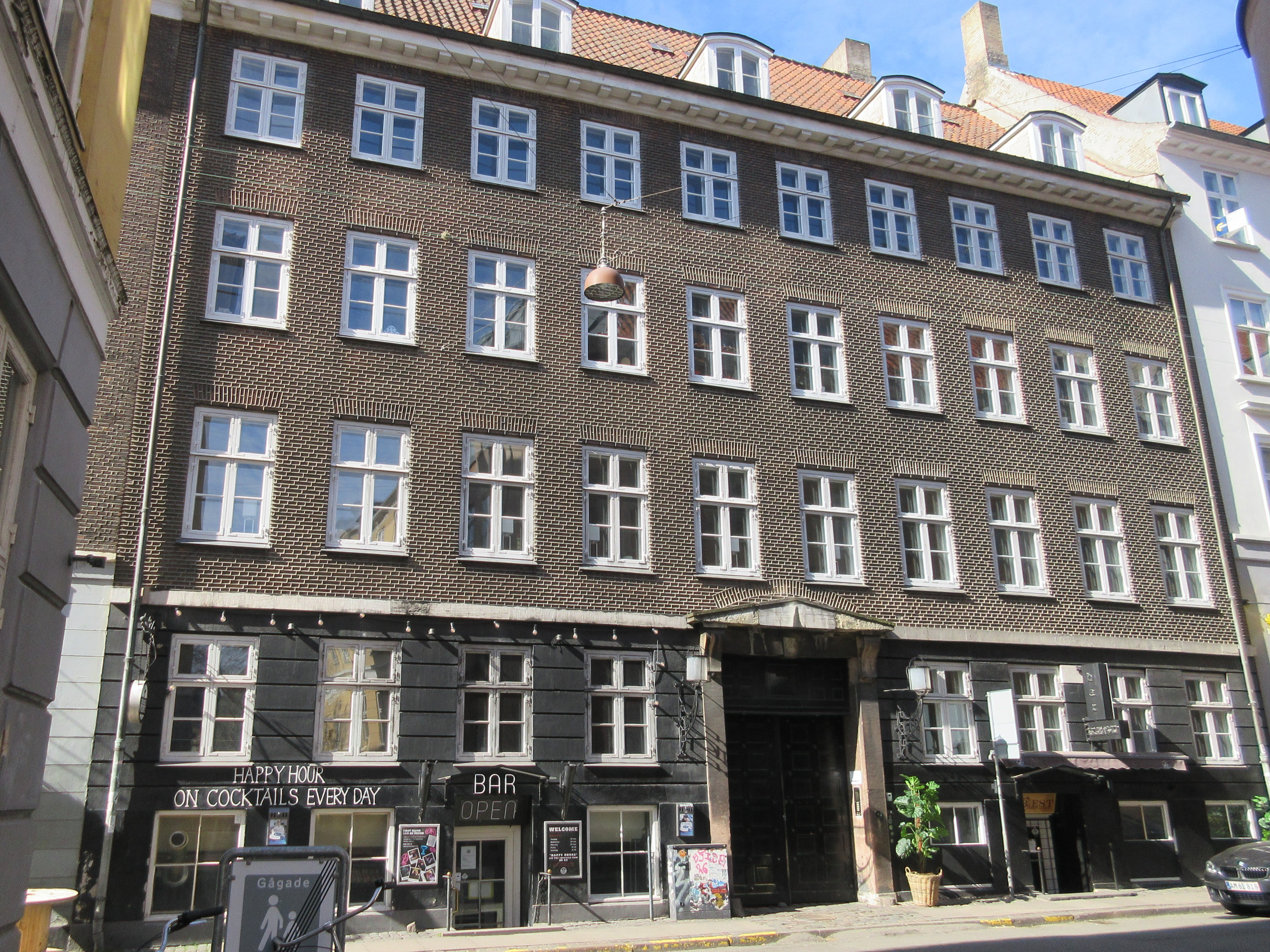
- Interactive map of the Klosterstræde 23 area

General information
- Location: Copenhagen, Denmark
- Coordinates: 55°40′45.73″N 12°34′29.64″E
- Completed: 1808
- Renovated: 1812

Klosterstræde 23 is a Neoclassical property in the Old Town of Copenhagen, Denmark. The building is located opposite Gråbrødrestræde, a short street linking Klosterstræde with Gråbrødretorv. The building was listed on the Danish registry of protected buildings and places in 1950.

== History ==
=== Site history, 1689–1792 ===
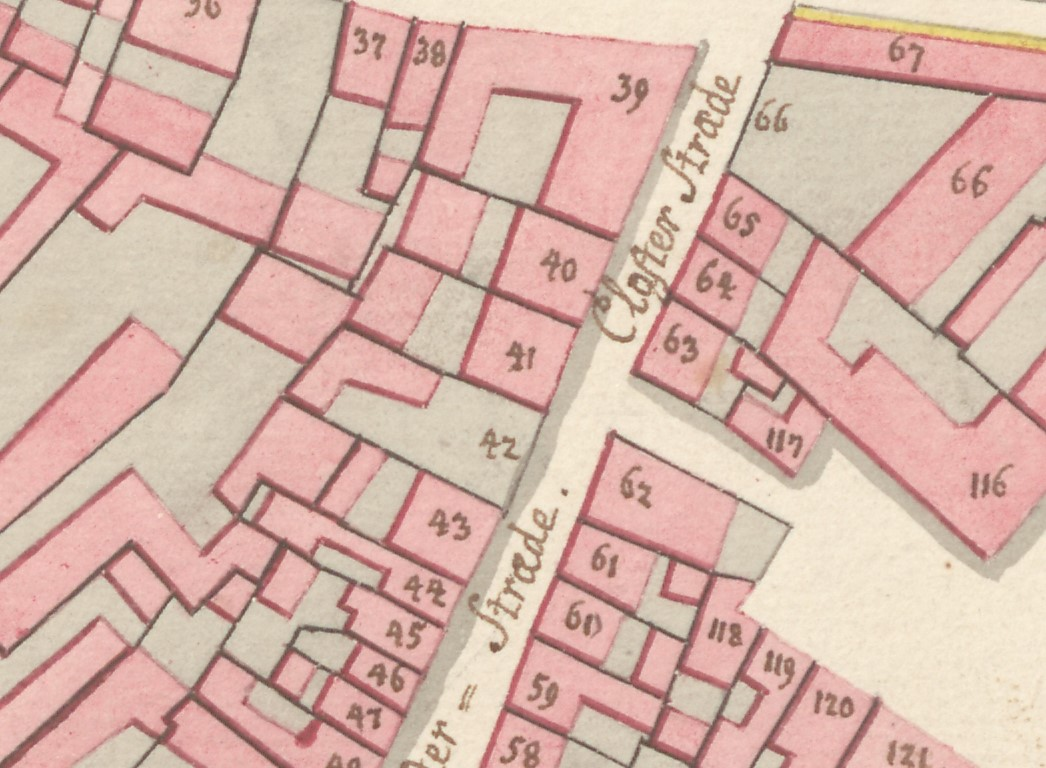
No. 40 and No. 41 seen in a detail from Christian Gedde's map of Frimand's Quarter

The site was formerly made up of two smaller properties. One was listed in Copenhagen's new cadastre of 1756 as No. 40 in Frimand's Quarter, owned by weaver Paul Laurentz. The other property was listed as No. 41, owned by one Christian Jensen's widow.

No. 40 was home to 19 residents in four households at the 1787 census. Fridrich Wilhelm Grundahl, a master tailor, resided in the building with his wife Inger Marie Grundahl, their 26-year-old son Johann Anton Grundahl and one maid. Hans Friderich Fritz, chief bookkeeper of Finance Casse Directionen with title of kammerråd, resided in the building with his wife Sophie Magdalene and one maid. Dithlef Christian Wibe, a scribe at the Gældskommissionen under Hod- og Stadsretten, resided in the building with his wife Marie Wibe and one maid. Rasmus Nørager, a grocer (spækhøker), resided in the building with his wife Katrine Nørager, their two sons (aged two and four) and five lodgers.

No. 41 was home to 30 residents in five households at the 18978 census. Daniel Jungberg, a military musician and the owner of the building (fired from the Royal Life Guard), resided in the building with his wife Karen Peters Datter. Christen Jensen, a workman, resided in the building with his wife Mette Olsdatter, their three children (aged four to nine) and five lodgers. Bernt Levig Blocj, a Jewish merchant, resided in the building with his wife Igade Nosboch, their four children (aged one to four) a wet nurse and a maid. Christian Colding, a courier and fireman at Tydske Cancellie, resided in the building with his wife Henriche Holm, their four children (aged two to 13), a lodger and a maid. Hans Hansen, a beer seller (øltapper), resided in the building with his wife Karen Hans Datter.

=== Fischer and the new building ===
No. 40 was later acquired by Peter Christian Weinreich Fischer (1772–1834). On 20 June 1796, he established a glazier's business in the building.

Fuscher's property (No. 40) was listed in the new vadastre of 1806 as No. 71 in Frimand's Quarter. The old No. 41 was listed as No. 72 and belonged to canvas merchant Fridr. Sørensen's widow at that time. In 1808, Fischer bought No. 42 from the widow and merged it with his existing property. The present building on the site was constructed for him in 1811–12. The adjacent building Klosterrstræde 21 was also constructed for him in 1814–17. Gischer subsequently ran his glazier's business, which would later be continued by his son, Peter Didrik Weinreich Fischer (1813–1884), from No. 21.

The military officer Christian de Meza (1792–1865), then an artillery captain, was a resident in the building from 1722 to 1824. C. H. Visby (1801–1870), a clergyman, was a resident in the building in 1827–28. Gottlieb Siesbye (1803–1884), a journalist and editor, was a resident in the building from 1873 to 1877.

== Architecture ==
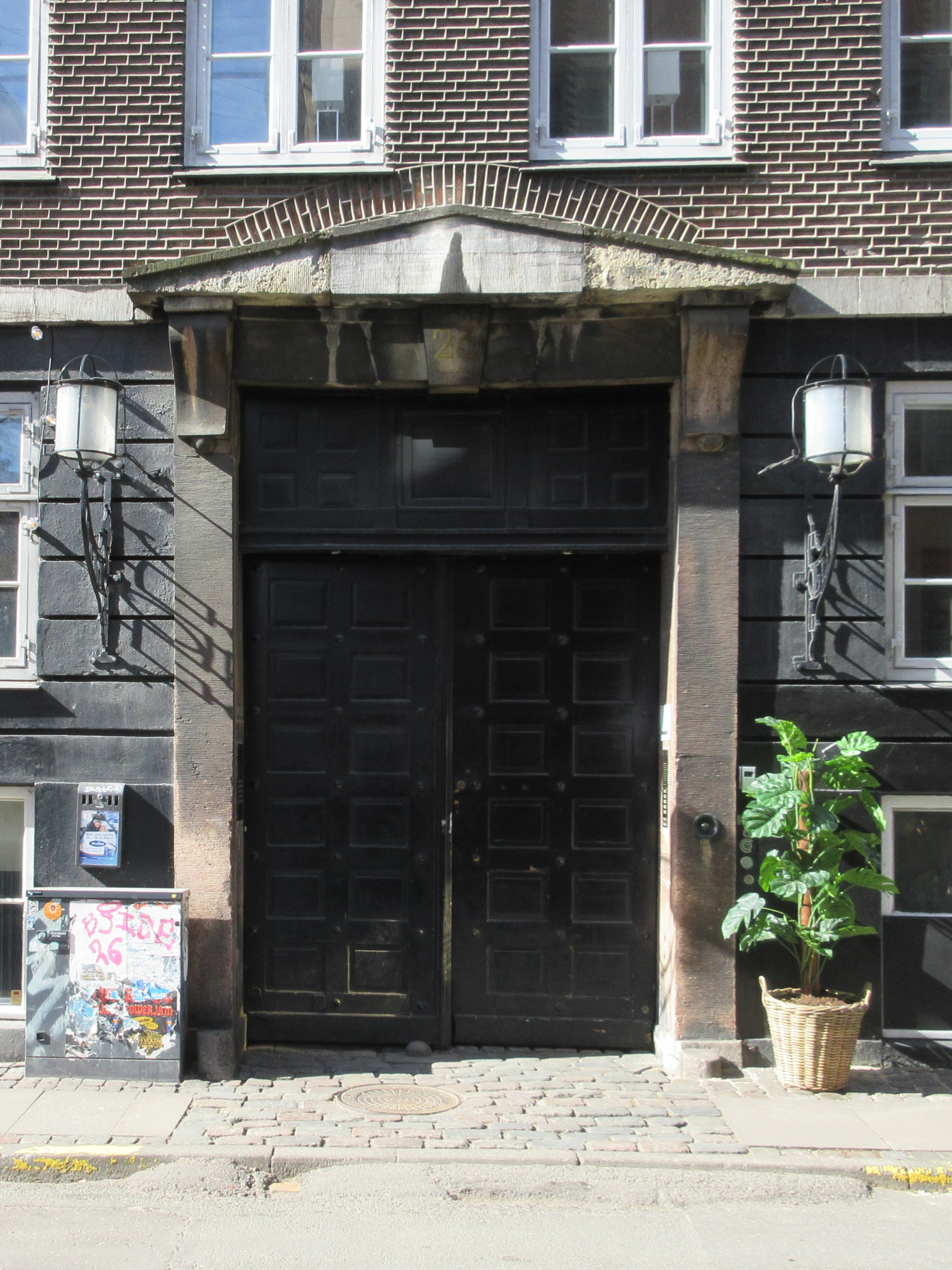
The main entrance

Klosterstræde 23 is a four-storey, four-winged complex built in red brick. The main wing towards the street is 10 bays wide and is constructed with projecting layers of mortar between the bricks (Danish: hamburgfuge).

The main entrance is topped by a triangular pediment. The façade is finished by a cornice supported by corbels. The roof is clad with red tiles.

The main wing and part of the two side wings contain two large apartments on each floor. The rear wing and bottom part of the two side wings contain two somewhat smaller apartments on each floor. The two halves of each side wing are separated by staircases.
