= Dunbar Park (Chicago) =

Public park in South Side, Chicago, Illinois

Coordinates: 41.8395°N 87.6208°W

Dunbar Park is a park located at 300 East 31st Street in the Douglas community of South Side, Chicago, Illinois.

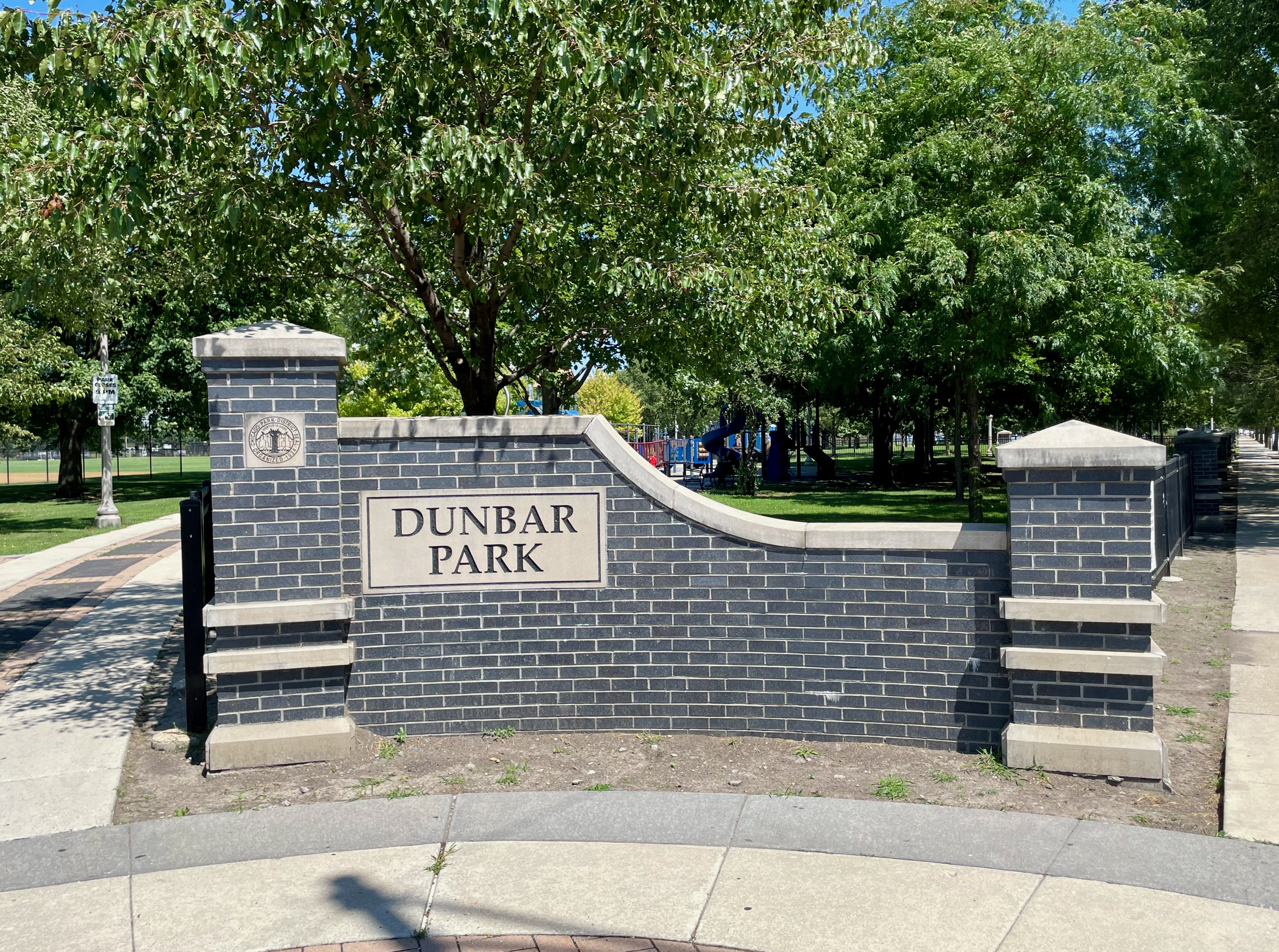
Entrance to Dunbar Park

The 20-acre (81,000 m^{2}) site was acquired in 1962, and transformed into Dunbar Park between 1964 and 1966. The park was named for poet Paul Laurence Dunbar.

Chicago Park District commissioned Chicago artist and sculptor Debra Hand to create a bronze statue of Dunbar in 2012. The statue, which is 9 feet (2.7 m) tall, was unveiled at the park in 2014.
