= Paul Laurence Dunbar =

African-American writer (1872–1906)

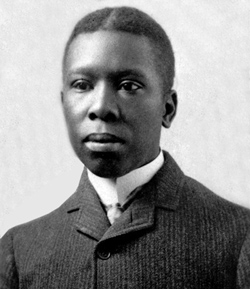
- Dunbar, circa 1890
- Born: June 27, 1872; Dayton, Ohio, U.S.
- Died: February 9, 1906 (aged 33); Dayton, Ohio, U.S.
- Resting place: Woodland Cemetery, Dayton, Ohio, U.S.
- Occupations: Poet, novelist, short story writer
- Spouse: Alice Ruth Moore (m. 1898)

Signature
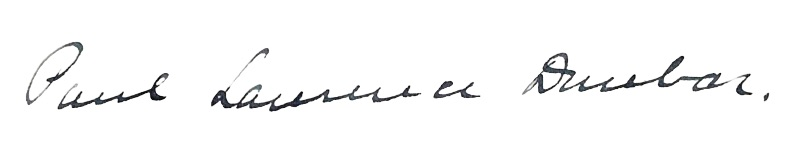

Paul Laurence Dunbar (June 27, 1872 – February 9, 1906) was an American poet, novelist, and short story writer of the late 19th and early 20th centuries. Born in Dayton, Ohio, to parents who had been enslaved in Kentucky before the American Civil War, Dunbar began writing stories and verse when he was a child. He published his first poems at the age of 16 in a Dayton newspaper, and served as president of his high school's literary society.

Dunbar's popularity increased rapidly after his work was praised by William Dean Howells, a leading editor associated with Harper's Weekly. Dunbar became one of the first African-American writers to establish an international reputation. In addition to his poems, short stories, and novels, he also wrote the lyrics for the musical comedy In Dahomey (1903), the first all-African-American musical produced on Broadway in New York. The musical later toured in the United States and the United Kingdom. Suffering from tuberculosis, which then had no cure, Dunbar died in Dayton, Ohio, at the age of 33.

Much of Dunbar's more popular work in his lifetime was written in the "Negro dialect" associated with the antebellum South, though he also used the Midwestern regional dialect of James Whitcomb Riley. Dunbar also wrote in conventional English in other poetry and novels and is considered the first important African American sonnet writer. Since the late 20th century, scholars have become more interested in these other works.

== Biography ==
=== Early life ===
Paul Laurence Dunbar was born at 311 Howard Street in Dayton, Ohio, on June 27, 1872, to parents who were enslaved in Kentucky before the American Civil War. After being emancipated, his mother Matilda moved to Dayton with other family members, including her two sons Robert and William from her first marriage. Dunbar's father Joshua escaped from slavery in Kentucky before the war ended. He traveled to Massachusetts and volunteered for the 55th Massachusetts Infantry Regiment, one of the first two black units to serve in the war. The senior Dunbar also served in the 5th Massachusetts Cavalry Regiment. Paul Dunbar was born six months after Joshua and Matilda's wedding on Christmas Eve, 1871.

The marriage of Dunbar's parents was troubled, and Dunbar's mother left Joshua soon after having their second child, a daughter. Joshua died on August 16, 1885, when Paul was 13 years old.

Dunbar wrote his first poem at the age of six and gave his first public recital at the age of nine. His mother assisted him in his schooling, having learned to read expressly for that purpose. She often read the Bible with him, and thought he might become a minister in the African Methodist Episcopal Church. It was the first independent black denomination in America, founded in Philadelphia in the early 19th century.

Dunbar was the only African-American student during his years at Central High School in Dayton. Orville Wright was a classmate and friend. Well-accepted, he was elected as president of the school's literary society, and became the editor of the school newspaper and a debate club member.

=== Writing career ===
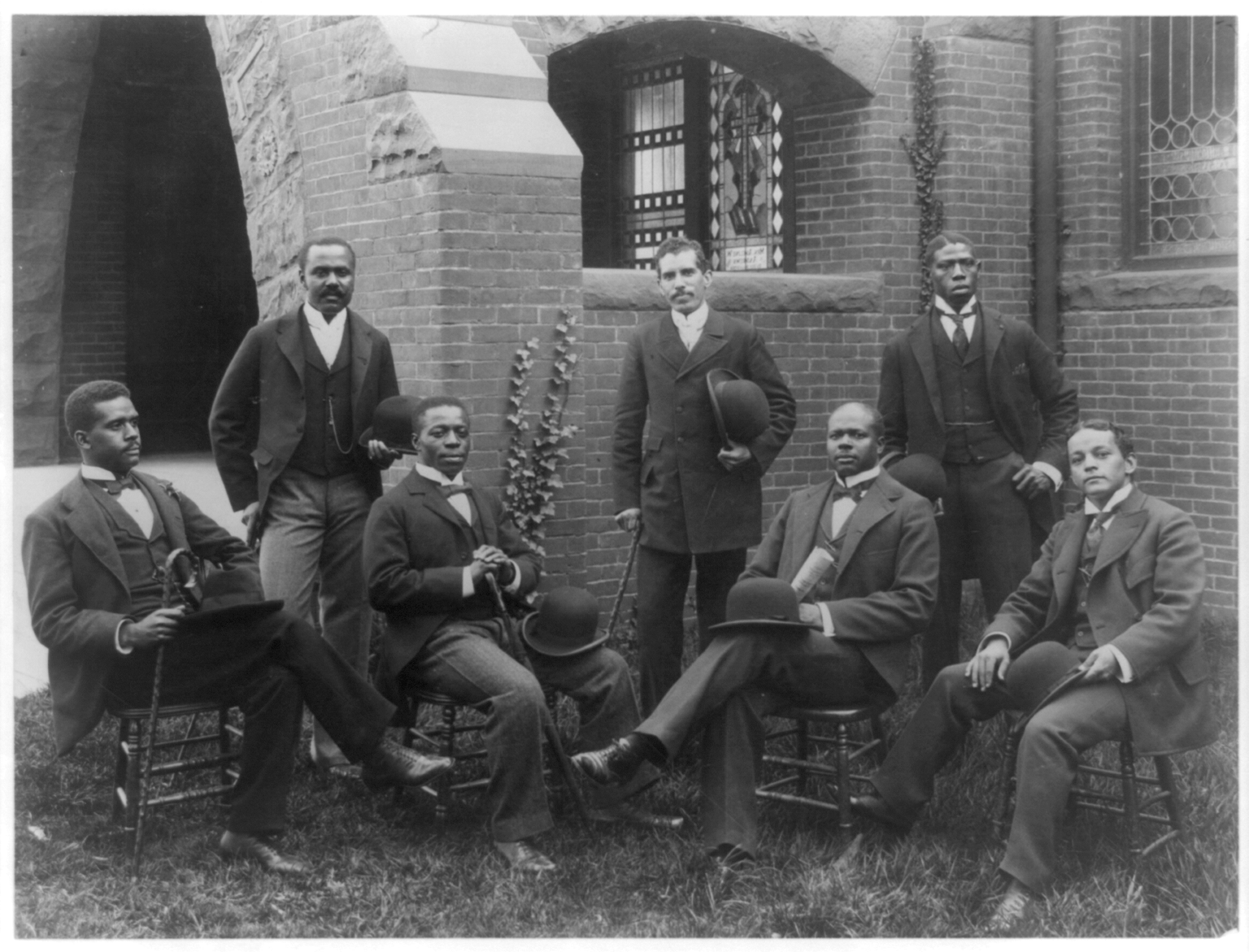
Howard University 1900 – class picture with Dunbar in the rear right

At the age of 16, Dunbar published the poems "Our Martyred Soldiers" and "On The River" in 1888 in Dayton's The Herald newspaper. In 1890, Dunbar wrote and edited The Tattler, Dayton's first weekly African-American newspaper. It was printed by the fledgling company of his high-school acquaintances, Wilbur and Orville Wright. The paper lasted six weeks.

After completing his formal schooling in 1891, Dunbar took a job as an elevator operator, earning a salary of four dollars a week. He had hoped to study law, but was not able to because of his mother's limited finances. He was restricted at work because of racial discrimination. Dunbar was an elevator attendant in the same building in which Eva Best's father conducted an architect's office, and she became acquainted with Dunbar and his literary endeavors through seeing him in her father's building. She was among the first persons to recognize the poetry of Dunbar and was influential in bringing him before the public.

In 1892, Dunbar asked the Wrights to publish his dialect poems in book form, but the brothers did not have a facility that could print books. They suggested he go to the United Brethren Publishing House which, in 1893, printed Dunbar's first collection of poetry, Oak and Ivy. Dunbar subsidized the printing of the book, and quickly earned back his investment in two weeks by selling copies personally, often to passengers on his elevator.

The larger section of the book, the Oak section, consisted of traditional verse, whereas the smaller section, the Ivy, featured light poems written in dialect. The work attracted the attention of James Whitcomb Riley, the popular "Hoosier Poet". Both Riley and Dunbar wrote poems in both standard English and dialect.

His literary gifts were recognized, and older men offered to help him financially. Attorney Charles A. Thatcher offered to pay for college, but Dunbar wanted to persist with writing, as he was encouraged by his sales of poetry. Thatcher helped promote Dunbar, arranging work to read his poetry in the larger city of Toledo at "libraries and literary gatherings." In addition, psychiatrist Henry A. Tobey took an interest and assisted Dunbar by helping distribute his first book in Toledo and sometimes offering him financial aid. Together, Thatcher and Tobey supported the publication of Dunbar's second verse collection, Majors and Minors (1896).

Despite frequently publishing poems and occasionally giving public readings, Dunbar had difficulty supporting himself and his mother. Many of his efforts were unpaid and he was a reckless spender, leaving him in debt by the mid-1890s.

On June 27, 1896, the novelist, editor, and critic William Dean Howells published a favorable review of Dunbar's second book, Majors and Minors in Harper's Weekly. Howells' influence brought national attention to the poet's writing. Though Howell praised the "honest thinking and true feeling" in Dunbar's traditional poems, he particularly praised the dialect poems. In this period, there was an appreciation for folk culture, and black dialect was believed to express one type of that. The new literary fame enabled Dunbar to publish his first two books as a collected volume, titled Lyrics of Lowly Life, which included an introduction by Howells.

Dunbar maintained a lifelong friendship with the Wright brothers. Through his poetry, he met and became associated with black leaders Frederick Douglass and Booker T. Washington, and was close to his contemporary James D. Corrothers. Dunbar also became a friend of Brand Whitlock, a journalist in Toledo who went to work in Chicago. Whitlock joined the state government and had a political and diplomatic career.

By the late 1890s, Dunbar started to explore the short story and novel forms; in the latter, he frequently featured white characters and society.

=== Later work ===
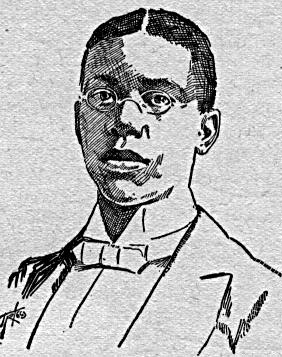
1897 sketch by Norman B. Wood

Dunbar was prolific during his relatively short career: he published a dozen books of poetry, four books of short stories, four novels, lyrics for a musical, and a play.

His first collection of short stories, Folks From Dixie (1898), a sometimes "harsh examination of racial prejudice", had favorable reviews.

This was not the case for his first novel, The Uncalled (1898), which a critic described as "dull and unconvincing". Dunbar explored the spiritual struggles of a white minister Frederick Brent, who had been abandoned as a child by his alcoholic father and raised by a virtuous white spinster, Hester Prime. (Both the minister and woman's names recalled Nathaniel Hawthorne's The Scarlet Letter, which featured a central character named Hester Prynne.) With this novel, Dunbar has been noted as one of the first African Americans to cross the "color line" by writing a work solely about white society. Critics at the time complained about his handling of the material, not his subject. The novel was not a commercial success.

Dunbar's next two novels also explored lives and issues in white culture, and some contemporary critics found these lacking as well. However, literary critic Rebecca Ruth Gould argues that one of these, The Sport of the Gods, culminates as an object lesson in the power of shame – a key component of the scapegoat mentality – to limit the law's capacity to deliver justice.

In collaboration with the composer Will Marion Cook, and Jesse A. Shipp, who wrote the libretto, Dunbar wrote the lyrics for In Dahomey, the first musical written and performed entirely by African Americans. It was produced on Broadway in 1903; the musical comedy successfully toured England and the United States over a period of four years and was one of the more successful theatrical productions of its time.

Dunbar's essays and poems were published widely in the leading journals of the day, including Harper's Weekly, the Saturday Evening Post, the Denver Post, Current Literature and others. During his life, commentators often noted that Dunbar appeared to be purely black African, at a time when many leading members of the African-American community were notably of mixed race, often with considerable European ancestry.

In 1897 Dunbar traveled to England for a literary tour; he recited his works on the London circuit. He met the young black composer Samuel Coleridge-Taylor, who set some of Dunbar's poems to music. Coleridge-Taylor was influenced by Dunbar to use African and American Negro songs and tunes in future compositions. Also living in London at the time, African-American playwright Henry Francis Downing arranged a joint recital for Dunbar and Coleridge-Taylor, under the patronage of John Hay, a former aide to President Abraham Lincoln, and at that time the American ambassador to Great Britain. Downing also lodged Dunbar in London while the poet worked on his first novel, The Uncalled (1898).

Dunbar was active in the area of civil rights and the uplifting of African Americans. He was a participant in the March 5, 1897, meeting to celebrate the memory of abolitionist Frederick Douglass. The attendees worked to found the American Negro Academy under Alexander Crummell.

=== Marriage and declining health ===
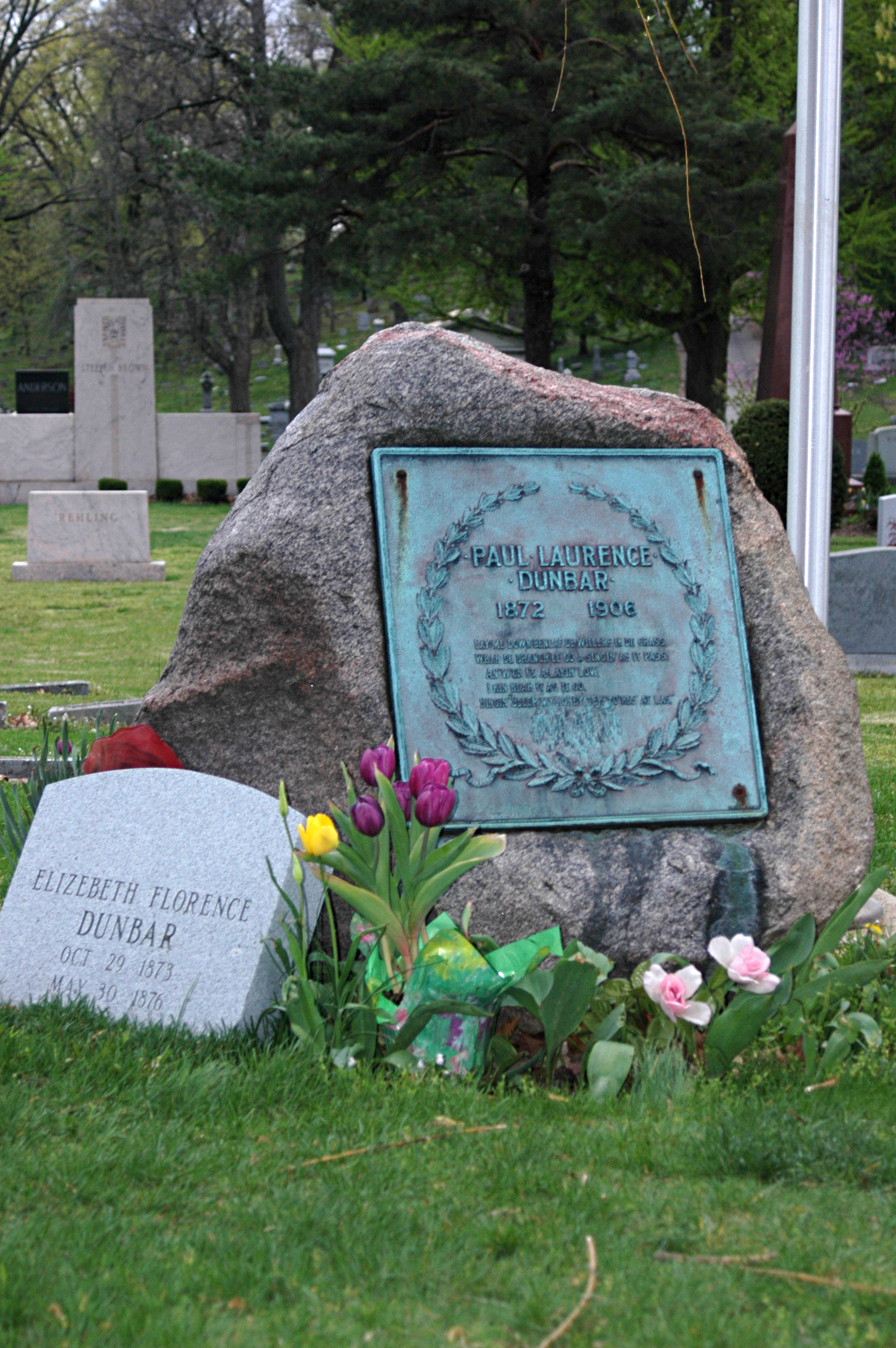
Dunbar grave site at Woodland Cemetery, 2007

After returning from the United Kingdom, Dunbar married Alice Ruth Moore, on March 6, 1898. She was a teacher and poet from New Orleans whom he had met three years earlier. Dunbar called her "the sweetest, smartest little girl I ever saw". A graduate of Straight University (now Dillard University), a historically black college, Moore is best known for her short story collection, Violets. She and her husband also wrote books of poetry as companion pieces. An account of their love, life and marriage was portrayed in Oak and Ivy, a 2001 play by Kathleen McGhee-Anderson.

In October 1897 Dunbar took a job at the Library of Congress in Washington, DC. He and his wife moved to the capital, where they lived in the comfortable LeDroit Park neighborhood. At the urging of his wife, Dunbar soon left the job to focus on his writing, which he promoted through public readings. While in Washington, DC, Dunbar attended Howard University after the publication of Lyrics of Lowly Life.

In 1900, he was diagnosed with tuberculosis, then often fatal, and his doctors recommended drinking whiskey to alleviate his symptoms. On the advice of his doctors, he moved to Colorado with his wife, as the cold, dry mountain air was considered favorable for TB patients. Dunbar and his wife separated in 1902, after he beat her nearly to death but they never divorced. Depression and declining health drove him to a dependence on alcohol, which further damaged his health.

Dunbar returned to Dayton in 1904 to be with his mother. He died of tuberculosis on February 9, 1906, at the age of 33. He was interred in the Woodland Cemetery in Dayton.

== Literary style ==
Dunbar's work is known for its close attention to craft in his formal poetry as well as his dialect poetry. These traits were well matched to the tune-writing ability of Carrie Jacobs-Bond (1862–1946), with whom he collaborated.

=== Use of dialect ===
Dunbar wrote much of his work in conventional English, while using African-American dialect for some of it, as well as regional dialects. Dunbar felt there was something suspect about the marketability of dialect poems, as if blacks were limited to a constrained form of expression not associated with the educated class. One interviewer reported that Dunbar told him, "I am tired, so tired of dialect", though he is also quoted as saying, "my natural speech is dialect" and "my love is for the Negro pieces".

Dunbar credited William Dean Howells with promoting his early success, but was dismayed at the critic's encouragement that he concentrate on dialect poetry. Angered that editors refused to print his more traditional poems, Dunbar accused Howells of "[doing] me irrevocable harm in the dictum he laid down regarding my dialect verse." Dunbar was continuing in a literary tradition that used Negro dialect; his predecessors included such writers as Mark Twain, Joel Chandler Harris and George Washington Cable.

Two brief examples of Dunbar's work, the first in standard English and the second in dialect, demonstrate the diversity of the poet's works:

(From "Dreams")

What dreams we have and how they fly
Like rosy clouds across the sky;
Of wealth, of fame, of sure success,
Of love that comes to cheer and bless;
And how they wither, how they fade,
The waning wealth, the jilting jade —
The fame that for a moment gleams,
Then flies forever, — dreams, ah — dreams!

(From "A Warm Day In Winter")

"Sunshine on de medders,
Greenness on de way;
Dat's de blessed reason
I sing all de day."
Look hyeah! What you axing'?
What meks me so merry?
'Spect to see me sighin'
W'en hit's wa'm in Febawary?

== Critical response and legacy ==
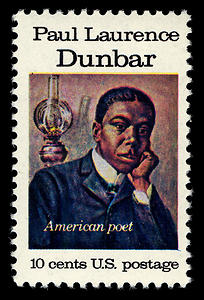
Dunbar on 1975 U.S. postage stamp

Dunbar became the first African-American poet to earn national distinction and acceptance. The New York Times called him "a true singer of the people – white or black." Frederick Douglass once referred to Dunbar as, "one of the sweetest songsters his race has produced and a man of whom [he hoped] great things."

His friend and writer James Weldon Johnson highly praised Dunbar, writing in The Book of American Negro Poetry:

Paul Laurence Dunbar stands out as the first poet from the Negro race in the United States to show a combined mastery over poetic material and poetic technique, to reveal innate literary distinction in what he wrote, and to maintain a high level of performance. He was the first to rise to a height from which he could take a perspective view of his own race. He was the first to see objectively its humor, its superstitions, its short-comings; the first to feel sympathetically its heart-wounds, its yearnings, its aspirations, and to voice them all in a purely literary form.

This collection was published in 1931, following the Harlem Renaissance, which led to a great outpouring of literary and artistic works by African American people. They explored new topics, expressing ideas about urban life and migration to the North. In his writing, Johnson also criticized Dunbar for his dialect poems, saying they had fostered stereotypes of blacks as comical or pathetic, and reinforced the restriction that blacks write only about scenes of antebellum plantation life in the South.

Dunbar has continued to influence other writers, lyricists, and composers. Composer William Grant Still used excerpts from four dialect poems by Dunbar as epigraphs for the four movements of his Symphony No. 1 in A-flat, "Afro-American" (1930). The next year it was premiered, the first symphony by an African American to be performed by a major orchestra for a US audience. Dunbar's vaudeville song "Who Dat Say Chicken in Dis Crowd?" may have influenced the development of "Who dat? Who dat? Who dat say gonna beat dem Saints?", the popular chant associated with the New Orleans Saints football team, according to Dunbar scholar Hollis Robbins. In 2025, Chicago-based Will Liverman released two-album project called “The Dunbar/Moore Sessions,” inspired by the poetry of the couple.

Maya Angelou titled her autobiography I Know Why the Caged Bird Sings (1969) from a line in Dunbar's poem "Sympathy", at the suggestion of jazz musician and activist Abbey Lincoln. Angelou said that Dunbar's works had inspired her "writing ambition." She returns to his symbol of a caged bird as a chained slave in much of her writings.

Dunbar's home in Dayton, Ohio, has been preserved as Paul Laurence Dunbar House, a state historical site that is included in the Dayton Aviation Heritage National Historical Park, administered by the National Park Service.

- His residence in LeDroit Park in Washington, DC, still stands.
- The Dunbar Library of Wright State University holds many of Dunbar's papers.
- In 2002, Molefi Kete Asante listed Paul Laurence Dunbar among his 100 Greatest African Americans.

Numerous schools and other places have been named in honor of Dunbar, including Paul Laurence Dunbar High School in Lexington, Kentucky, Paul Laurence Dunbar High School in Dayton, Ohio, Paul Laurence Dunbar High School in Baltimore, MD, Paul Laurence Dunbar Vocational High School in Chicago, Illinois, and several others. The main library at Wright State University in Dayton and a branch library in Dallas, Texas, are also named for Dunbar, whilst the Dunbar Apartments in Harlem, New York were built by John D. Rockefeller Jr. to provide housing for African Americans. Dunbar Park in Chicago features a statue of Dunbar that was created by sculptor Debra Hand and installed in 2014.

== Bibliography ==
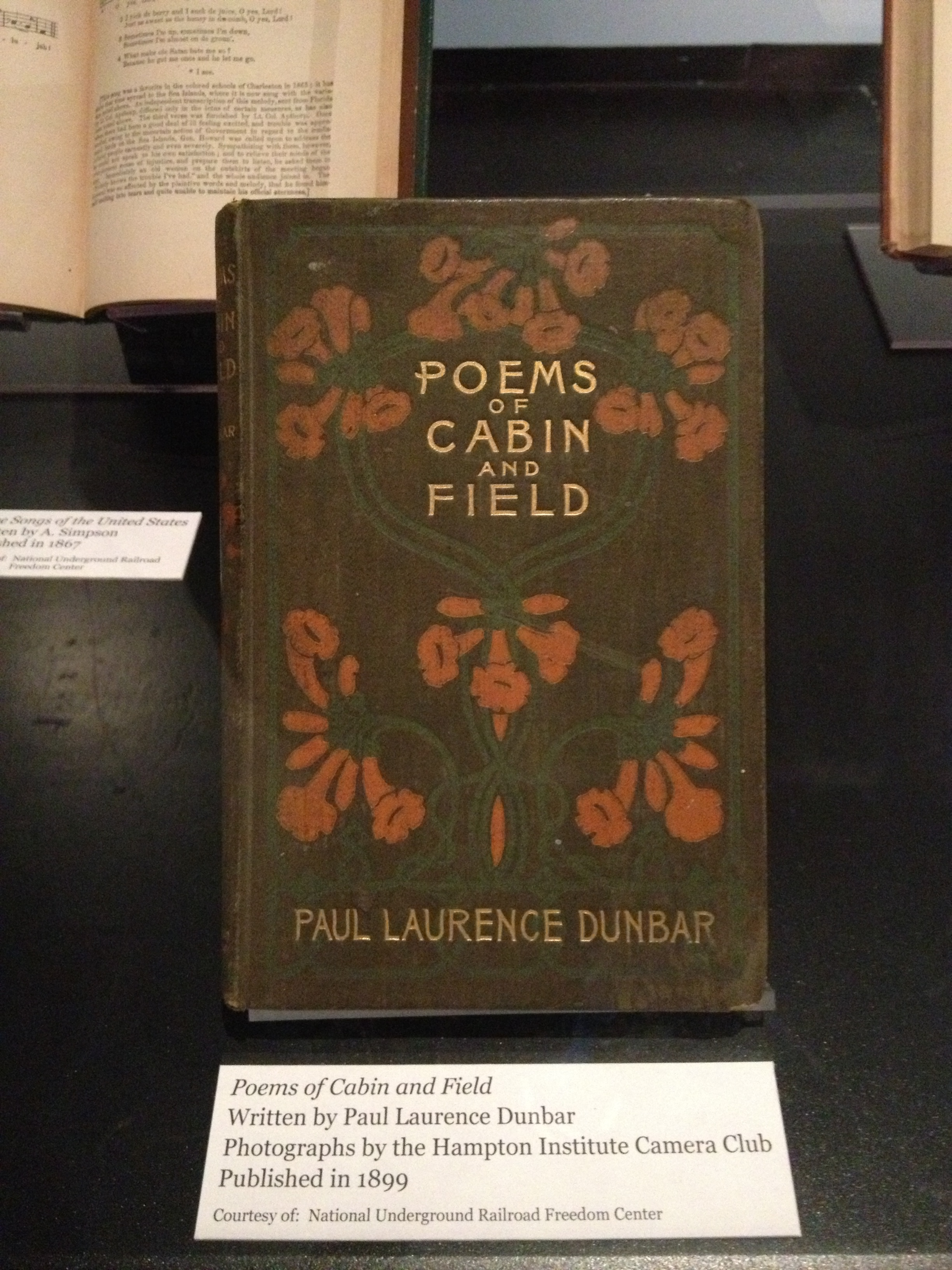
1899 edition of Poems of Cabin and Field

Poetry collections

- Oak and Ivy (1892)
- Majors and Minors (1896)
- Lyrics of Lowly Life (1896)
- Lyrics of the Hearthside (1899)
- Poems of Cabin and Field (1899)
- Candle-lightin' Time (1901)
- Lyrics of Love and Laughter (1903)
- When Malindy Sings (1903)
- Li'l' Gal (1904)
- Howdy, Honey, Howdy (1905)
- Lyrics of Sunshine and Shadow (1905)
- Joggin' Erlong (1906)

Short stories and novels

- Folks From Dixie (1898), short story collection
- The Uncalled (1898), novel
- The Strength of Gideon and Other Stories (1900)
- The Love of Landry
- The Fanatics, novel
- The Sport of the Gods (1902), novel
- In Old Plantation Days (1903), short story collection
- The Heart of Happy Hollow: A Collection of Stories (1904)

Articles

- "Representative American Negroes", in The Negro Problem, by Booker T. Washington, et al.

== See also ==
- "Ode to Ethiopia", one poem in the collection Oak and Ivy.
- African-American literature
- Dayton Aviation Heritage National Historical Park
- Samuel Coleridge-Taylor, black composer
