= Ode to Ethiopia =

Poem by Paul Laurence Dunbar

"Ode to Ethiopia" is a poem by Paul Laurence Dunbar, a noted African-American poet who achieved a national reputation in the United States before the end of the nineteenth century, published in his 1893 book Oak and Ivy.

== Summary ==
Dunbar presents ideas of Ethiopia as a mother, shows a pride in the African-American people, and encourages hope as well as racial pride. His poem emphasizes a belief in a brighter future ahead for the people of Ethiopia which is based on their own honor and hard labour.

== Afro American Symphony ==
Part of this poem was used as a prologue to the fourth movement of William Grant Still's Symphony No. 1 "Afro-American":

Be proud, my race, in mind and soul;
Thy name is writ on Glory's scroll
In characters of fire.
High 'mid the clouds of Fame's bright sky
Thy banner's blazoned folds now fly,
And truth shall lift them higher.

== See also ==
- African American literature
