= Klosterstræde =

Street in Copenhagen Municipality, Denmark

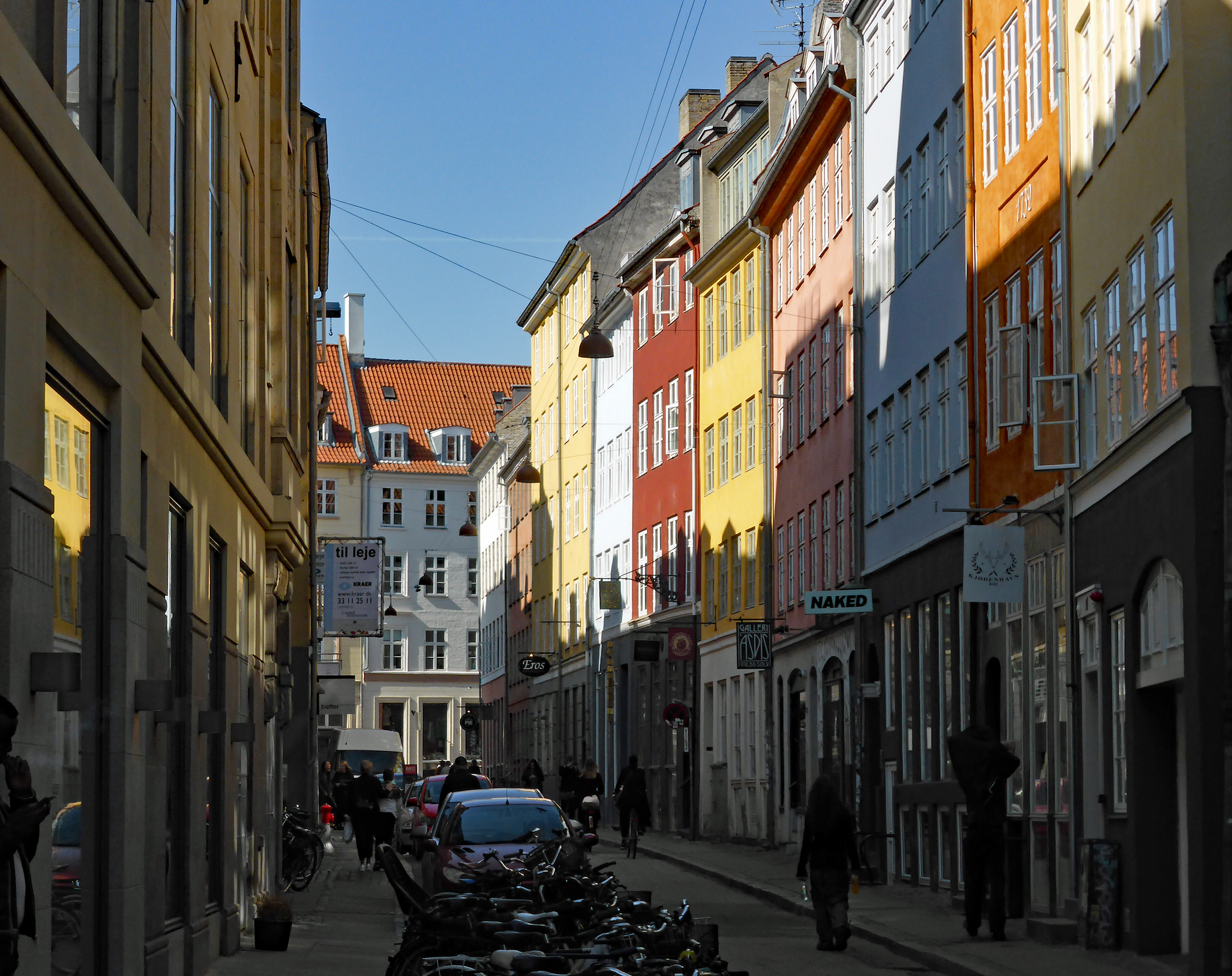
- Length: 150 m (490 ft)
- Location: Copenhagen, Denmark
- Quarter: Indre By
- Postal code: 1157
- Nearest metro station: Gammel Strand
- Coordinates: 55°40′45.12″N 12°34′31.44″E
- South end: Strøget
- North end: Skindergade

Klosterstræde (lit. "Priory Alley") is a street in the Old Town of Copenhagen, Denmark. It runs from the site where Amagertorv turns into Vimmelskaftet on the pedestrianized shopping street Strøget in the south to Skindergade in the north. A short street links Klosterstræde to the square Gråbrødretorv to the east.

== History ==
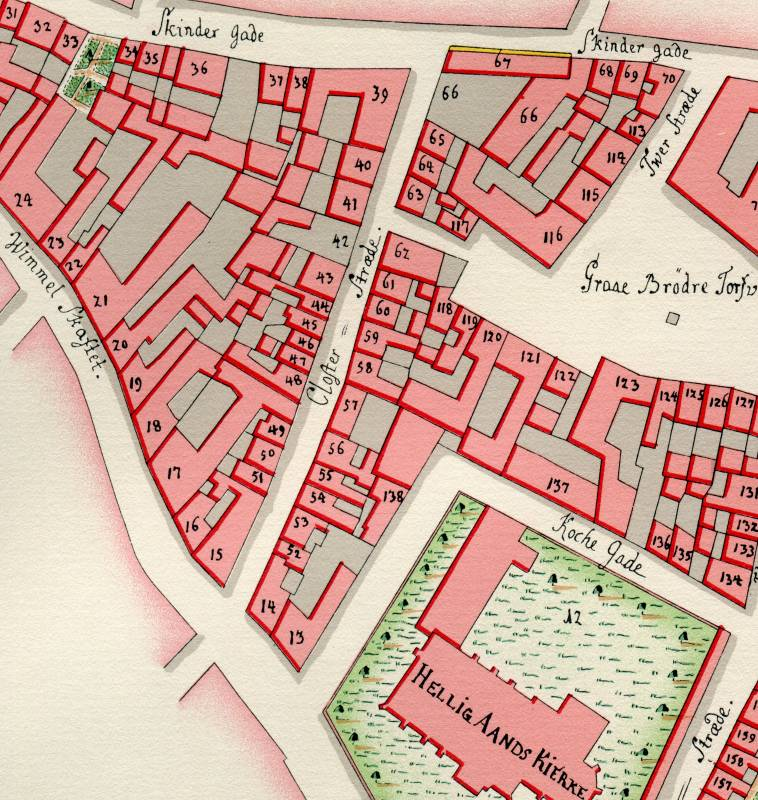
Klosterstræde seen on Gedde's district map, 1757

Klosterstræde has existed since the Middle Ages. Its name refers to the Franciscan Friary which was located at the site from 1238. It was the most important Franciscan priory in Denmark but was destroyed during the Reformation. Klosterstræde was hit hard by the Copenhagen Fire of 1795.

== Notable buildings and residents ==
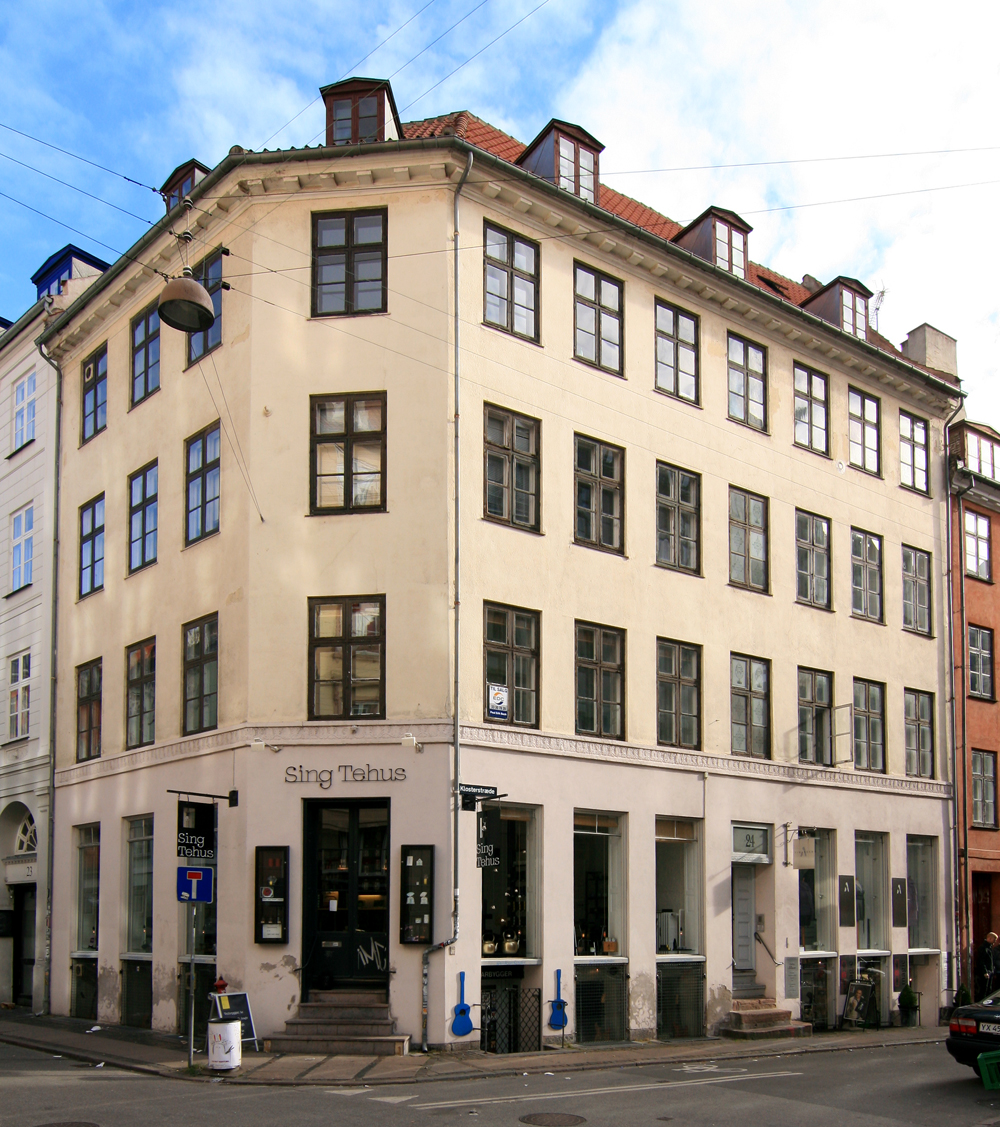
Klosterstræde 24

Most of the buildings in the street date from the 18th century. No. 8, No. 16, No. 21, No. 22, No. 23 and No. 24 are listed.

The building at the corner with Amagertorv was built for Kjøbenhavns Laane- og Discontobank in 1906 to design by Axel Berg. Håndværkerbanken, another bank, took over the property in 1924.

Faraos Cigarer, a retailer and publisher specializing in cartoons, fantasy and role play, has a cartoon store at No. 22. A Fame Store is located around the corner at Skindergade 27.

== See also ==
- Klosterstræde 16
- Klosterstræde 21
- Klosterstræde 24
