= Mary Davenport Engberg =

American violinist, composer and conductor (1880–1951)

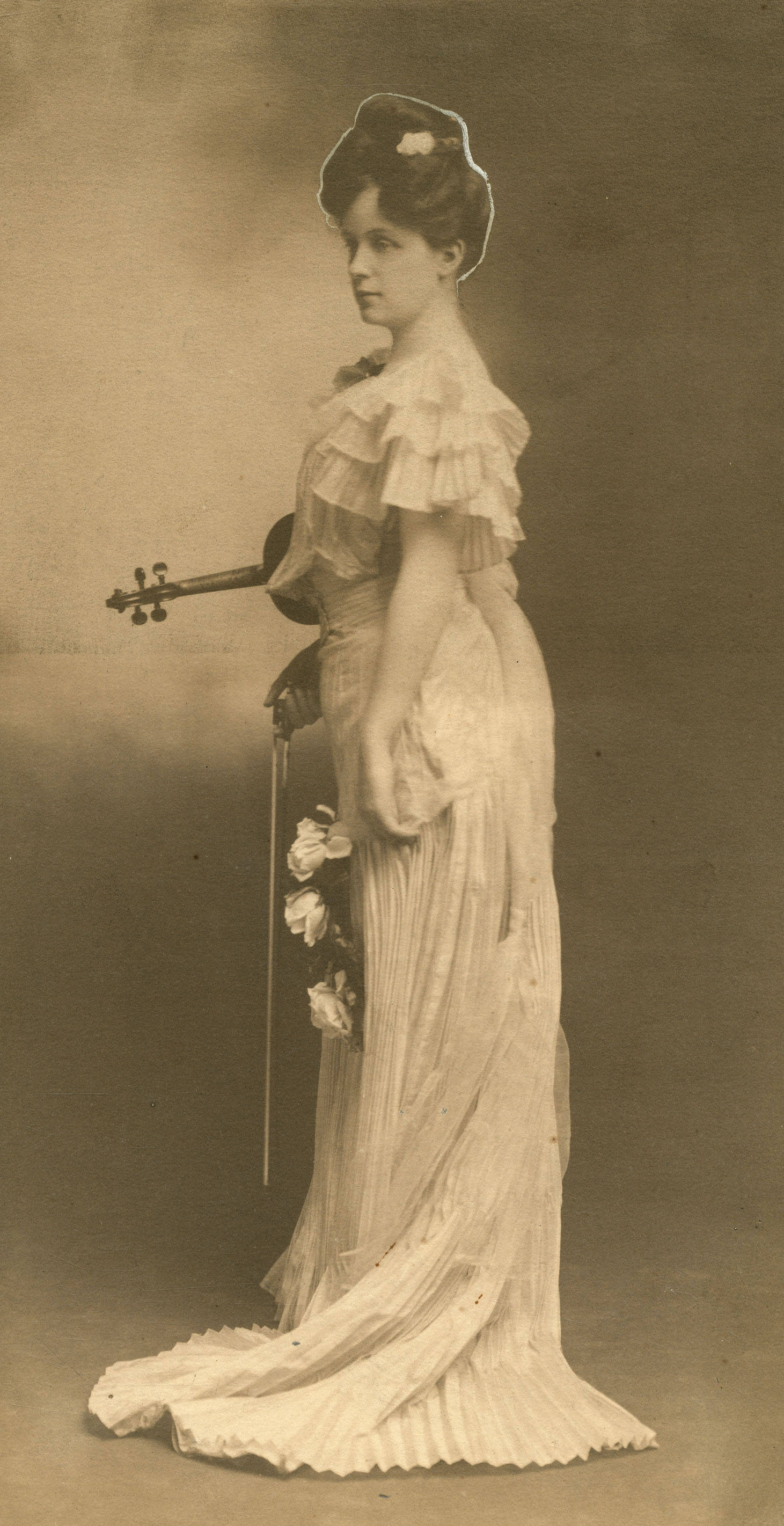

Mary Davenport Engberg, also referred to as Mary Davenport-Engberg and Madame Davenport-Engberg (15 February 1880 in Spokane – January 23, 1951 in Seattle) was an American violinist, composer and conductor.

Born to George A. and Mary Cornwall in a covered wagon en route from California to Washington state she was adopted by Mr. and Mrs. Richard Santell Davenport following the death of her mother. A cousin of the pianist Ethel Newcomb, she studied in Europe for 5 years, chiefly in Copenhagen with Anton Svendsen and Christian Sandby. On August 8, 1899 she married Henry Christian Engberg of Bellingham, Washington state.

She made her debut as a violinist in 1903 in Copenhagen and toured extensively in Europe. In 1904 she gave a concert in New York, and went on to perform largely on the West Coast of the US. She made her debut as a soloist in Seattle on December 13, 1908, when she soloed with the Seattle Symphony at a Sunday afternoon pops concert at the Moore Theatre.

In 1912, she returned to Bellingham to teach at the State Normal School there. Engberg went on to organize the 85-member Davenport Engberg Orchestra in Bellingham. She led its opening concert in 1914. “It is my firm belief that everywhere in every intelligent community there is lying dormant material with which to develop and build up a symphony orchestra,” said Ms. Davenport Engberg.

From 1921 until 1924 she was music director of the Seattle Civic Symphony Orchestra, an orchestra she founded for the purpose of developing orchestra players for the Seattle Symphony from the ranks of local students. She also taught violin extensively. Her compositions include pieces for violin.
