= Ludvig Engsund =

Swedish ice hockey goaltender

- Born: March 16, 1993 (age 32) Gothenburg, Sweden
- Height: 6 ft 2 in (188 cm)
- Weight: 176 lb (80 kg; 12 st 8 lb)
- Position: Goaltender
- Catches: Right
- Swedish Hockey League team: Rögle BK
- Playing career: 2013–present

Ludvig Engsund (born March 16, 1993) is a Swedish ice hockey goaltender. He is currently playing with Rögle BK of the Swedish Swedish Hockey League.
