= Karl Krueger =

American conductor

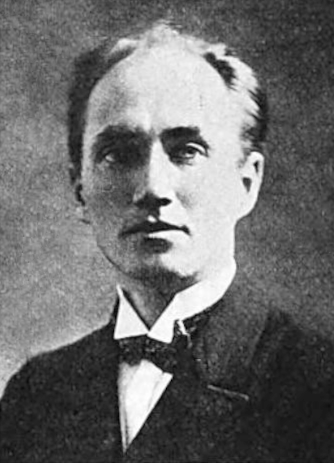
- Born: January 19, 1894; Atchison, Kansas, U.S.
- Died: July 21, 1979 (aged 85); Elgin, Illinois, U.S.
- Education: University of Kansas
- Occupation: Conductor
- Known for: Music director of the Seattle Symphony, Kansas City Philharmonic, and Detroit Symphony Orchestra

Karl Krueger (January 19, 1894 — July 21, 1979) was an American conductor. He was the music director of the Seattle Symphony, Detroit Symphony, and the Kansas City Philharmonic.

== Early life ==
Krueger was born in Atchison, Kansas. He studied law, philosophy, economics, and music at the New England Conservatory, University of Kansas, University of Vienna, and University of Heidelberg. He studied conducting with Franz Schalk, Arthur Nikisch, and Felix Weingartner, and composition with Robert Fuchs, George Whitefield Chadwick, and Charles-Marie Widor.

== Career ==
In 1919, Krueger was appointed assistant conductor of the Vienna State Opera and remained with the company for five seasons. In 1926, Krueger reorganized the Seattle Symphony and served as its music director until 1932. Krueger founded the Kansas City Philharmonic, the predecessor to the present-day Kansas City Symphony, in 1933 and remained its music director until 1943. He then took the directorship of the Detroit Symphony Orchestra from 1943 to 1949.

== Later life ==
After leaving the Detroit Symphony, Krueger briefly founded and led American Arts Orchestra, a broadcast and recording orchesta, and served as the general director of New Records Inc. Krueger wrote a historical survey The Way of the Conductor: His Origins, Purpose and Procedures. Krueger died in 1979 after a brief illness in Elgin, Illinois.
