= Katrine Engberg =

Danish actress and novelist (born 1975)

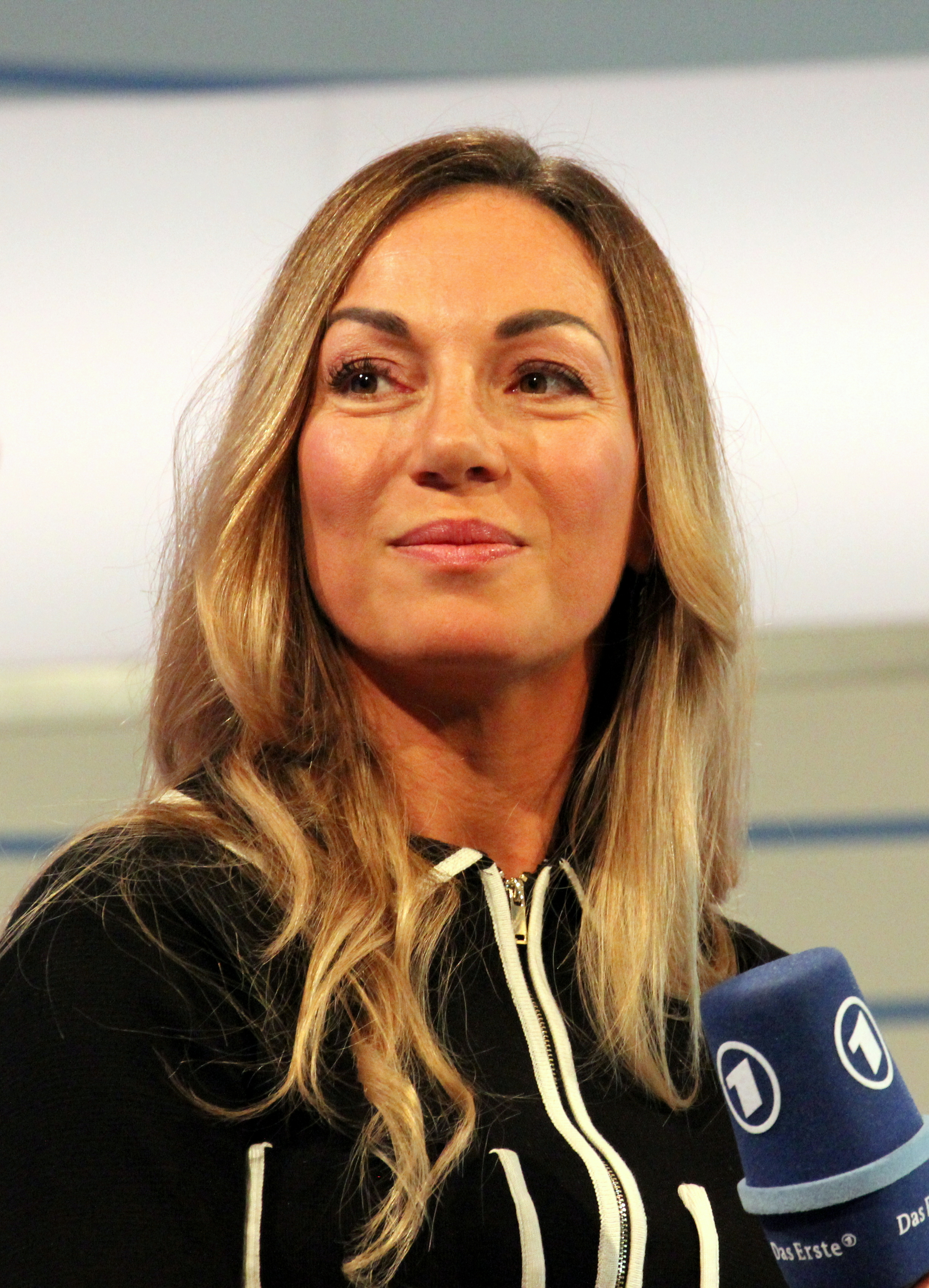
- Engberg in 2018
- Born: 29 June 1975 (age 51); Copenhagen, Denmark
- Occupations: Writer, actress, dancer and choreographer
- Spouse: Timm Vladimir (m. 2003; div. 2021)
- Children: 1

Katrine Engberg (born 29 June 1975 in Copenhagen, Denmark) is a Danish actress, former dancer and choreographer, and author. Some of her films include The Keeper of Lost Causes, Skytten, and 50 Gründe Kopenhagen zu lieben.

She was married to Timm Vladimir from 2003 to 2021. They have a son.

Engberg is the author of a series of books about Copenhagen detectives Jeppe Kørner and Anette Werner: The Tenant, The Butterfly House, and The Harbor. The books are translated to English by Tara Chase.

A review in the New York Times compares Engberg favourably to the Norwegian author Jo Nesbø.
