= Englund =

Englund is a surname of Swedish origin, meaning "meadow grove" (from Swedish äng, meadow, and lund, grove).

== Geographical distribution ==
As of 2014, 57.0% of all known bearers of the surname Englund were residents of Sweden (frequency 1:1,255), 31.0% of the United States (1:84,563), 4.5% of Finland (1:8,866), 2.0% of Norway (1:18,431) and 1.6% of Denmark (1:24,976).

In Sweden, the frequency of the surname was higher than national average (1:1,255) in the following counties:

1. Gävleborg County (1:402)
2. Västernorrland County (1:501)
3. Uppsala County (1:675)
4. Norrbotten County (1:707)
5. Värmland County (1:721)
6. Jämtland County (1:768)
7. Dalarna County (1:835)
8. Västmanland County (1:917)
9. Västerbotten County (1:1,066)
10. Örebro County (1:1,093)
11. Södermanland County (1:1,214)
12. Stockholm County (1:1,251)

In Finland, the frequency of the surname was higher than national average (1:8,866) in the following regions:

1. Åland (1:305)
2. Ostrobothnia (1:1,207)
3. Uusimaa (1:6,061)
4. Tavastia Proper (1:7,267)

== People ==
- Anabel Englund (born 1992), American singer songwriter
- Andreas Englund (born 1996), Swedish ice hockey player
- David Englund (born 1962), American designer
- Einar Englund (1916–1999), Finnish composer
- Gene Englund (1917–1995), American basketball player
- John Englund (1873–1948), American politician and newspaper editor
- Lars-Erik Englund (1934–2010), Swedish Air Force Lieutenant General
- Nils-Joel Englund (1907–1995), Swedish cross-country skier
- Ola Englund (born 1981), Swedish guitar player, record producer, YouTuber, and owner of Solar Guitars
- Olov Englund (born 1983), Swedish Bandy player
- Patric Englund (born 1970), Swedish ice hockey player
- Peter Englund (born 1957), Swedish author
- Robert Englund (born 1947), American actor
- Robert Keith Englund (1952–2020), American archaeologist
- Sanna Englund (born 1975), German actress
- Tom S. Englund (born 1973), Swedish guitar player and singer of Evergrey
- Will Englund (born 1953), American editorial writer and associate editor

== See also ==
- Englund, Minnesota, an unincorporated community, United States
- Englund Gambit, chess opening
- England (surname)
- Engsund, surname
