= Lynching of John Carter =

1927 murder of a Black man in Arkansas

John Carter
- Died: May 4, 1927; Little Rock, Arkansas, United States
- Monuments: 34.7411°N 92.2767°W

John Carter was an African-American man who was murdered in Little Rock, Arkansas, on May 4, 1927. Grabbed by a mob after another Black man had been apprehended for the alleged murder of a white girl, Carter was hanged from a telephone pole, shot, dragged through the streets, and then burned in the center of the city's Black part of town with materials that a white crowd of perhaps 5,000 people had looted from nearby stores and businesses.

== Description ==
Noted as "one of the most notorious incidents of racial violence in the state's history", the prelude to the lynching of John Carter happened on April 30, 1927, with the discovery of the body of a young white girl, found in the First Presbyterian Church. The body was found by the janitor named Dixon, and the next day the police arrested him and his "mulatto" son, Lonnie Dixon. They were moved to the city jail of Texarkana, because the local authorities feared unrest, and that night a crowd of thousands gathered at the city hall hoping to kill the two. On May 1 people were searching nearby jails in Arkansas to find where the Dixons had been moved to, and crowds were still assembling outside the state penitentiary demanding the Dixons on the night of May 2. Tensions over the murder remained high over the next few days, and when on May 4 a Black man, John Carter, was accused of assaulting a white woman and her daughter, an armed posse went looking for him. When they found him, on the outskirts of Little Rock, they pistol-whipped him before they hanged him from a telephone pole and took shots at him with rifles, hitting more than 200 times.

The crowd took Carter's body down and in a caravan of cars drove him into Little Rock, strapped to the front of one car, and thence paraded him through the streets for several hours, roped to the back of another car, eventually arriving at West Ninth Street which was the heart of the city's African-American business district. Over the next few hours a crowd (of up to 5,000 whites) rioted and looted flammable materials from businesses and (mainly pews) from the nearby Bethel African Methodist Episcopal church, with which they set the mangled body on fire. When, hours later, the National Guard showed up, they saw that one person was "directing traffic with a charred arm" from Carter's body. While the sheriff and his men witnessed the lynching and took photographs of the body, with visible people in the background, no one was ever charged.

Rioters occupied the entire neighborhood and attacked people indiscriminately, causing residents to evacuate or to hide if they were unable to leave, with reports in the Arkansas Gazette that all "business houses and residences in the vicinity appeared deserted throughout the night". A group of white women occupied the steps of the headquarters of the fraternal Templars, and other whites occupied the porches of people's homes. African-Americans were chased, and others hid, only emerging after the soldiers had arrived and having received assurances that it was safe, one businessman refusing to go home until offered an escort there by a soldier. One man was caught and beaten, then tossed from car to car until he was rescued by a group of 20 young men who took him to the police headquarters, from where he was taken by ambulance to a hospital. He only escaped being burned alive through the intervention of a white man promising the rioters action against the Dixons. The police themselves refused to take action during the rioting, because police chief Burl C. Rotenberry was reportedly still out of town, after moving the Dixons.

The lynching and the riot were condemned by local and state leaders (such as John Netherland Heiskell in a front-page editorial in the Arkansas Gazette), and the case drew national attention since the focus was already on the South, following the Great Mississippi Flood of 1927 (which had itself been the cause of unrest leading to racist violence, including the lynching of Jim and Mark Fox), the image of Arkansas was at stake, and the possible effect on national relief for flood damage. Unrest persisted for weeks after the events; Black people fled the city, and two Black out-of-state newspapers (the Pittsburgh Courier and the Chicago Defender) were banned from circulation by the Little Rock Board of Censors. On May 19, Lonnie Dixon, the son of the janitor who found the girl's body, was tried and quickly sentenced to death and executed.

== Aftermath ==
The lynching of John Carter, which reportedly caused "a mass exodus of local blacks", is said to have been the last lynching in Little Rock. The white community kept the story under wraps, according to Arkansas Times columnist Jay Barth, but it was as important to the people of Little Rock as the murder of Emmett Till was years later in Mississippi, in that it instilled fear in the Black citizens of a white-dominated town. A small display at the Mosaic Templars Cultural Center remembers John Carter, but Barth argued that the city should erect a physical monument.
