= Mosaic Templars Cultural Center =

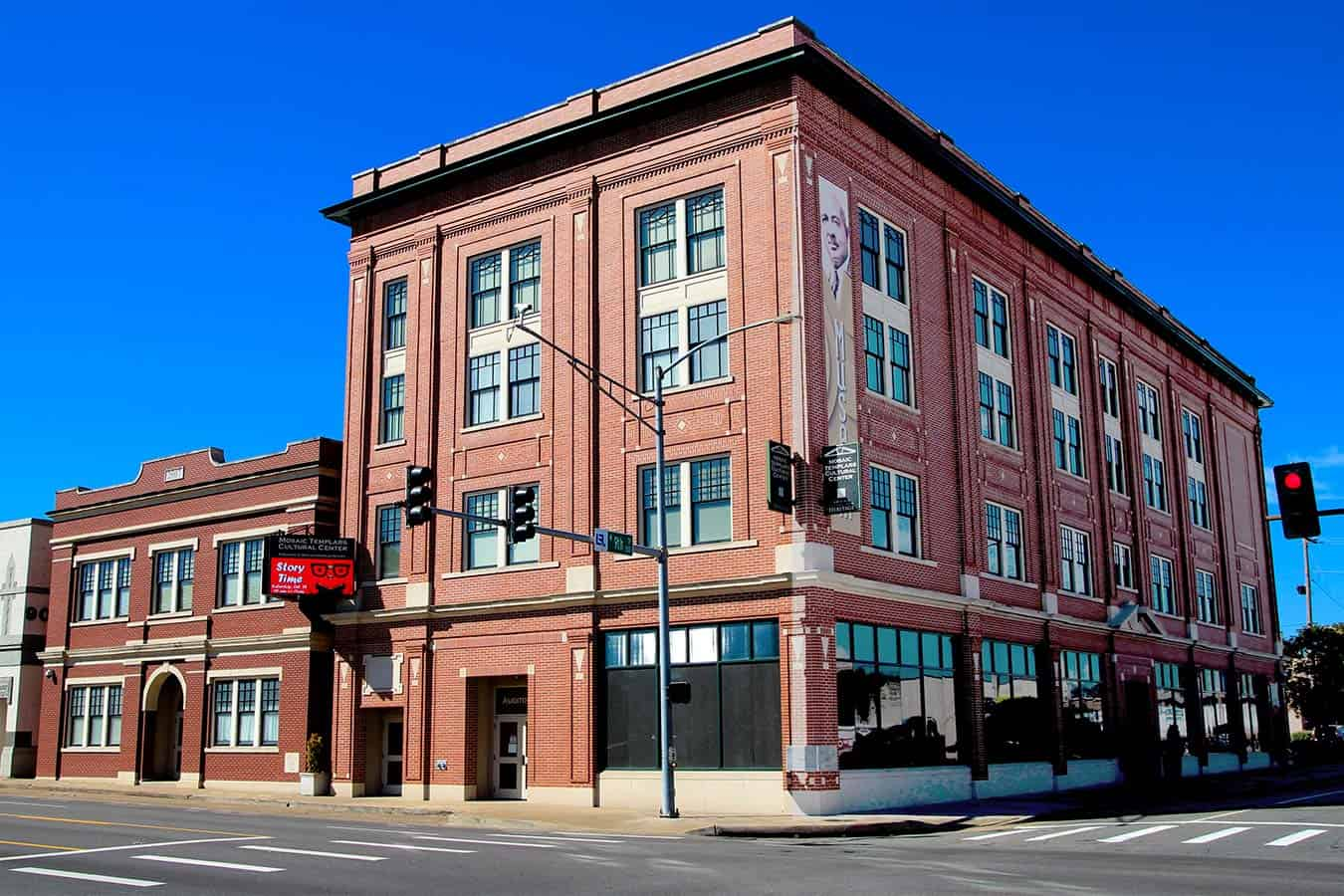
- Established: 2008
- Location: 501 West Ninth Street; Little Rock, Arkansas, Southern United States
- Coordinates: 34°44′27″N 92°16′37″W
- Type: African American history museum
- Website: www.mosaictemplarscenter.com

The Mosaic Templars Cultural Center is a nationally-accredited, world-class Department of Arkansas Heritage museum and cultural center in Little Rock, Arkansas, United States. Its mission is to collect, preserve, interpret, and celebrate African American history, culture, and community in Arkansas from 1870 to the present (African Americans in Arkansas) and to inform and educate the public about Black achievements, especially in business, politics, and the arts.

== History ==
The Mosaic Templars of America was a black fraternal order founded by John E. Bush and Chester W. Keatts, two former slaves, in Little Rock, Arkansas in 1883. The organization originally provided illness, death, and burial insurance during an era when few basic services were available to black people. In the 1930s, the MTA began to feel the effects of the Great Depression and eventually ceased operations. However, a single chapter remains in Barbados.

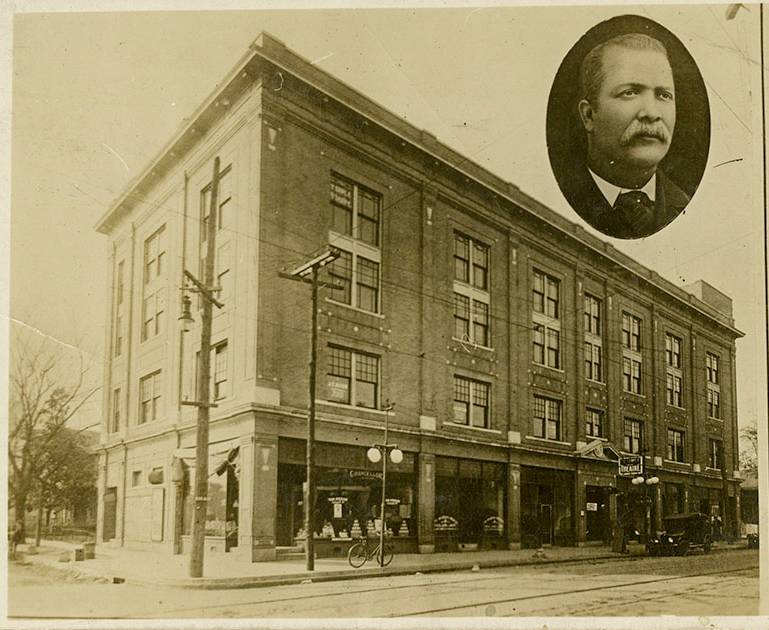
Mosaic Templars Building and John E. Bush (c. 1916)

Various businesses rented the former Mosaic Templars building into the late 20th century, but changing business climates, urban renewal, and the construction of a nearby highway through the old West Ninth Street business district left the building without occupants and in disrepair. In 1992, the building was slated for demolition so that a fast-food restaurant could be built on the lot. On January 19, 1993, the Society for the Preservation of the Mosaic Templars of America Building, a group of urban preservationists, was incorporated to lobby against the building's destruction. The city of Little Rock purchased the building for $110,000 in late 1993, marking the first time the city purchased a building for historic preservation.

The structure burned to the ground on March 12, 2005. City voters passed a $185,000 1993 bond initiative to purchase additional property lots around the building, and planning began for an African American culture and history museum on the site. In 2001, the Society won passage of two laws in the Arkansas state legislature. The first law provided money to fund the creation of the museum and the second turned the museum over to the Department of Arkansas Heritage, a state agency.

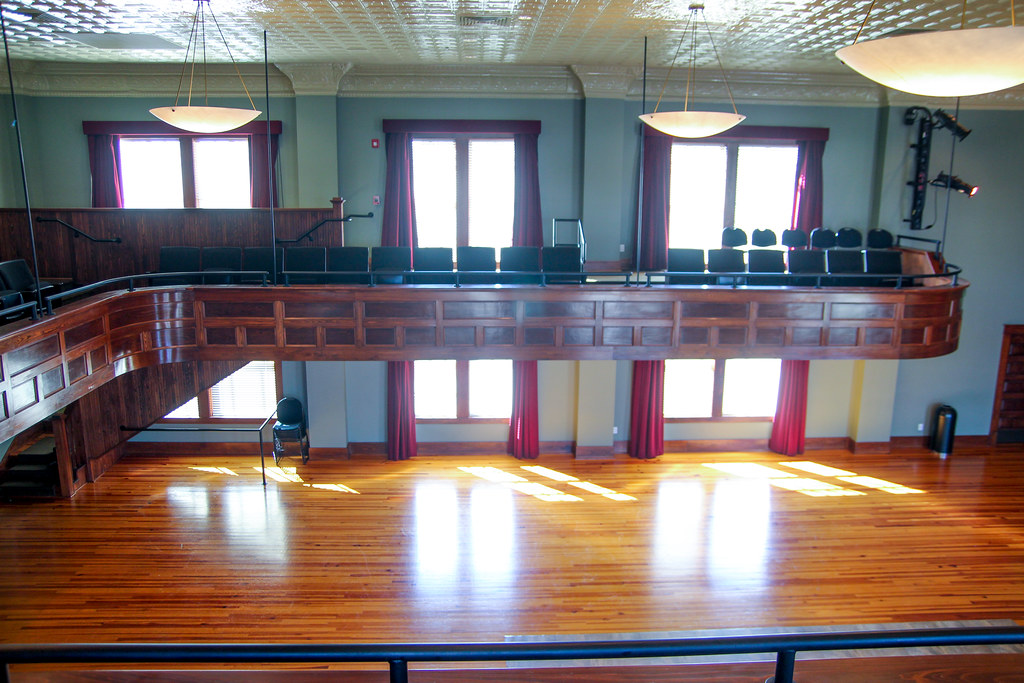
Ballroom

A new building was constructed on the site and the Mosaic Templars Cultural Center was turned over to the state. The four-story museum opened on September 19, 2008. Members of the remaining Barbados lodge attended its opening.

== Museum ==
The museum consists of a permanent exhibit, interactive children's gallery, and temporary exhibit gallery on the first floor, the Arkansas Black Hall of Fame on the third, and the Bush-Remmel genealogical research center and library on the second. The Mosaic Templars Cultural Center has more than 8,000 square feet (740 m^{2}) of interactive exhibit and education space. A third-floor auditorium provides the opportunity to explore the story of Arkansas's African Americans through public forums, conferences, and performing arts.

== See also ==
- Mosaic Templars State Temple
- List of museums focused on African Americans
