= Carrie Still Shepperson =

American educator

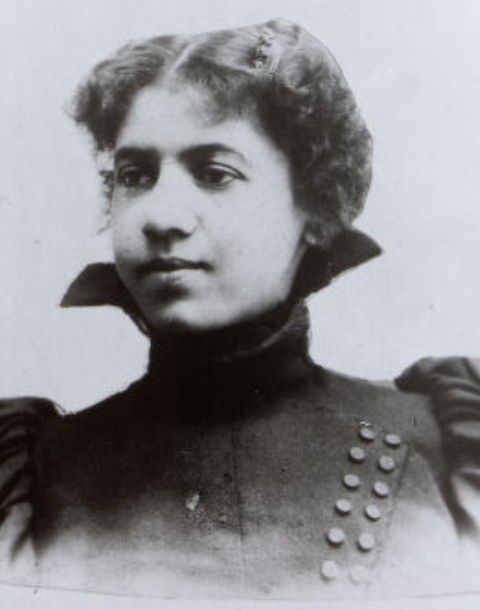
- Carrie Still Shepperson, from a portrait made in the 1890s
- Born: Carrie Lena Fambro; June 15, 1869 near Milledgeville, Georgia, U.S.
- Died: May 18, 1927 (aged 57)
- Other names: Carrie L. Still
- Occupation: Educator
- Children: William Grant Still Jr.
- Relatives: Verna Arvey (daughter-in-law), Celeste Headlee (great-granddaughter)

Carrie Still Shepperson (June 15, 1869 – May 18, 1927) was an American educator based in Arkansas.

== Early life and education ==
Carrie Lena Fambro was born near Milledgeville, Georgia, the daughter of Sarah Antoinette "Anne" Fambro. She graduated from Atlanta University in 1886.

== Career ==
Fambro taught at Alabama State Agricultural and Mechanical College in the early 1890s, before she married. As a young widow with a little son to support, she moved to Little Rock, Arkansas, and taught there for 30 years, at Union High School from 1896 to 1902, at Capital Hill School beginning in 1902, and later at M. W. Gibbs High School. She created a library at the Capitol Hill School, which she funded with a benefit program of performances by students and others. After that success, she continued to stage annual shows in Little Rock, to support the city's Black schools.

Shepperson also led school choirs, and directed her students in Shakespeare plays. She lectured on classroom discipline at a county institute for Black teachers in 1899. She was secretary of the Little Rock branch of the NAACP.

== Personal life ==
Fambro married twice, and was twice a widow. Her first husband was a fellow teacher, William Grant Still. They married in 1894 and had a son, composer and conductor William Grant Still Jr. Her first husband died shortly after their son's birth in 1895.

Her second husband was railway postal clerk Charles B. Shepperson; they married in 1904, and he died by drowning in 1922. She died in 1927, when she was about sixty years old, in Little Rock. There is a large collection of her son's papers in special collections at the University of Arkansas.
