= Chester W. Keatts =

American politician and fraternal order founder

- Chester W. Keatts
- Born: September 25, 1854; Little Rock, Arkansas, US
- Died: January 16, 1908 (aged 53)
- Occupation: U.S. Deputy Marshall
- Known for: Co-founded the Mosaic Templars of America in Little Rock, Arkansas

Chester W. Keatts (1854–1908), a former slave, co-founded the Mosaic Templars of America in Little Rock, Arkansas. He worked for the railway mail service, federal court, and as a lawman. He campaigned for two offices as a member of the Republican Party and initially received the majority of votes, but was not formally elected due to ballot interference by the Democrats.

== Early life ==
Keatts was born into slavery in Little Rock, Arkansas on September 25, 1854. Slavery was abolished in 1865, following the American Civil War. He completed his common school education in 1874. (Note: Public education was offered to African Americans in Pulaski County beginning in the Reconstruction era. John E. Bush, also educated by the system, became a Little Rock Capital Hill school principal.)

== Career ==
He farmed up to 1875, (Note: It is also said that he was a farmer until he was 24 years of age.) when he became a clerk for the U.S. Railway Mail Service, a position he held until 1890, during which time he was promoted three times.

Keatts was a Republican politician. In the 1890s, he was elected Pulaski County Circuit Clerk by an overwhelming majority, but was "counted out by the opposing party". Judge Henry Clay Caldwell appointed him to the position of crier and messenger of the United States Court of Appeals for the Eighth Circuit. Judge John A. Williams of the United States District Court for the Eastern District of Arkansas appointed him receiver of the Little Rock Traction and Electric Company in 1895, which required him to make a bond of $40,000 (equivalent to $1,548,000 in 2025). He was able to make the bond due to his stature in the community and personal holdings.

In 1896, he was made U.S. Deputy Marshall of the Eastern District of Arkansas. He was also Deputy Constable of Big Rock Township for several years. He ran for Little Rock police court judge, (Note: Merriam Webster defines police court as "a court of record that has jurisdiction over various minor offenses (such as breach of the peace) and the power to bind over for trial in a superior court or for a grand jury persons accused of more serious offenses.") a position he won by a large majority, but was counted out, like his election to Circuit Clerk.

== Mosaic Templars ==
They chose the name Mosaic Templars to reflect their religious motivations: they sought to provide leadership and succor for African Americans in the years after Reconstruction just as Moses had done for the Children of Israel during the escape from Egypt in the biblical story of Exodus.

— Nina Mjagkij, Organizing Black America

With his friend, John E. Bush, he founded the Mosaic Templars to provide life and burial insurance, in 1882. The organization was incorporated in Arkansas on May 24, 1883. They were initially motivated by the sight of former slaves having to beg for money to help overcome illness or pay for the burial of family members. Local temples were established to accept members, who were initiated into the group by conferring of eight secret initiation degrees. In August 1883, chambers were established for female members, having their own organizational rites and rituals. It became one of the largest African American organizations. The organization also came to offer support to individuals who wanted to start their own business and savings and loan services. Keatts served as Grand Mosaic Master until his death.

== Personal life ==
In 1881, he was married to Mary Warren. He was a member of the Knights of Pythias of North America, South America, Europe, Asia, Africa and Australia, Grand United Order of Odd Fellows in America, and Prince Hall Freemasonry. He was a trustee of the First Baptist Church in Little Rock.

Beginning in 1905, he was afflicted with dropsy. Keatts died at his home of pneumonia on January 16, 1908 and was buried at the Oakland-Fraternal Cemetery in Little Rock. In his will, Keatts left his estate to his wife, Mary. His mother, Mariah Wisham, contested the will a week after his death, suing for financial support. (Note: In an obituary, his mother and wife were the only named survivors.)
