= Arkansas State Archives =

Archives of the U.S. state of Arkansas

Agency overview
- Formed: April 27, 1905
- Preceding agency: Arkansas History Commission
- Jurisdiction: Government of Arkansas
- Headquarters: 1 Capitol Mall, Suite 215, Little Rock, Arkansas, U.S. 34°44′51.4″N 92°17′32.9″W
- Employees: 25 (December 2022)
- Agency executive: Dr. David Ware, State Historian
- Parent agency: Division of Arkansas Heritage
- Child agencies: Northeast Arkansas Regional Archives; Southwest Arkansas Regional Archives
- Key document: Arkansas History Commission Act of 1905
- Website: Arkansas State Archives

Arkansas History Commission and Its Work, readable pdf document

The Arkansas State Archives, or State Archives for short and abbreviated as ASA, is an agency of the Division of Arkansas Heritage responsible for the preservation of state government and historical records. It was established in 1905 as the Arkansas History Commission. One of its tasks is to increase public access to documents in the State Archive. It has published the Arkansas Handbook.

The State Archives also serves as the Arkansas Historical Advisory Board to assist public and private nonprofit organizations throughout the state in the acquisition, preservation and use of records of enduring value. The board receives, reviews, and makes recommendations on grant applications to fund state historical records projects through the National Historical Publications and Records Commission, the grant-making affiliate of the National Archives and Records Administration.

== History ==
The Arkansas General Assembly established the Arkansas History Commission through the Act of 1905 signed by Governor Jeff Davis on April 27. Aligned with Department of Parks and Tourism since 1971, it was transferred to the Department of Arkansas Heritage on July 1, 2016, and renamed Arkansas State Archives.

The High Lights of Arkansas History by Dallas T. Herndon, readable pdf document

Dallas T. Herndon was its first head.

== Headquarters ==
Located at 1 Capitol Mall, Suite 215 in Little Rock, Arkansas, just behind the state capitol, the State Archives is headed by the State Historian. Beneath the agency are two subordinate regional archives: the Northeast Arkansas Regional Archives at Powhatan and the Southwest Arkansas Regional Archives at Washington.

== See also ==
- List of U.S. state libraries and archives
- National Archives and Records Administration
