= Woodson, Arkansas =

- CDP
- Location in Pulaski County and the state of Arkansas
- Coordinates: 34°32′17″N 92°13′16″W
- Country: United States
- State: Arkansas
- County: Pulaski

Area
  - Total: 4.45 sq mi (11.52 km^{2})
  - Land: 4.35 sq mi (11.26 km^{2})
  - Water: 0.10 sq mi (0.26 km^{2})
- Elevation: 249 ft (76 m)

Population (2020)
  - Total: 346
  - Density: 79.6/sq mi (30.74/km^{2})
- Time zone: UTC-6 (Central (CST))
  - Summer (DST): UTC-5 (CDT)
- ZIP code: 72180
- Area code: 501
- FIPS code: 05-76730
- GNIS feature ID: 2403042

Woodson is a census-designated place (CDP) in Pulaski County, Arkansas, United States. As of the 2020 census, Woodson had a population of 346. It is part of the Little Rock–North Little Rock–Conway Metropolitan Statistical Area. Woodson and its accompanying Woodson Lake and Wood Hollow are the namesake for Ed Wood Sr., a prominent plantation owner, trader, and businessman at the turn of the 20th century. Woodson is adjacent to the Wood Plantation, the largest of the plantations own by Ed Wood Sr.

== History ==
Ed Wood, Sr. founded a settlement in central Arkansas after migrating from Alabama with his mother circa 1880. What is now called Woodson was known for much of the area's early history as "Wood Hollow" in recognition of Ed Wood Sr. and his 1890 purchase of the first black-owned plantation in Arkansas.

In the period following Radical Reconstruction, Ed Wood, Sr. began hosting gathering of the Prince Hall Freemasonry, of which he was a founding member of the Arkansas Lodge and held rank of highest degree. It was in these meetings at the Wood Plantation that he became an associated with Scipio Africanus Jones, John E. Bush, Chester W. Keatts, and John Hamilton McConico. From these meetings, a vibrant African-American Establishment matured. Wood was able to sustain the Prince Hall Lodge, but his contemporaries spun off to form the Mosaic Templars of America.

== Geography ==
According to the United States Census Bureau, the CDP has a total area of 4.4 square miles (11 km^{2}), of which 4.3 square miles (11 km^{2}) is land and 0.1 square miles (0.26 km^{2}) (2.29%) is water.

== Demographics ==
Historical population
Census	Pop.	Note	%±
2000	445		—
2010	403		−9.4%
2020	346		−14.1%
U.S. Decennial Census

=== Racial and ethnic composition ===
Woodson CDP, Arkansas – Racial and ethnic composition Note: the US Census treats Hispanic/Latino as an ethnic category. This table excludes Latinos from the racial categories and assigns them to a separate category. Hispanics/Latinos may be of any race.
Race / Ethnicity (NH = Non-Hispanic)	Pop 2000	Pop 2010	Pop 2020	% 2000	% 2010	% 2020
White alone (NH)	111	85	78	24.94%	21.09%	22.54%
Black or African American alone (NH)	329	286	234	73.93%	70.97%	67.63%
Native American or Alaska Native alone (NH)	0	1	4	0.00%	0.25%	1.16%
Asian alone (NH)	0	19	22	0.00%	4.71%	6.36%
Native Hawaiian or Pacific Islander alone (NH)	0	0	0	0.00%	0.00%	0.00%
Other race alone (NH)	0	2	0	0.00%	0.50%	0.00%
Mixed race or Multiracial (NH)	5	1	4	1.12%	0.25%	1.16%
Hispanic or Latino (any race)	0	9	4	0.00%	2.23%	1.16%
Total	445	403	346	100.00%	100.00%	100.00%

As of the 2020 United States census, there were 346 people, 141 households, and 82 families residing in the CDP.

=== 2000 census ===
As of the census of 2000, there were 445 people, 177 households, and 113 families residing in the CDP. The population density was 97.6 inhabitants per square mile (37.7/km^{2}). There were 198 housing units at an average density of 43.4 per square mile (16.8/km^{2}). The racial makeup of the CDP was 24.94% White, 73.93% Black or African American, and 1.12% from two or more races.

There were 177 households, out of which 27.7% had children under the age of 18 living with them, 42.4% were married couples living together, 19.8% had a female householder with no husband present, and 35.6% were non-families. 33.3% of all households were made up of individuals, and 10.7% had someone living alone who was 65 years of age or older. The average household size was 2.51 and the average family size was 3.26.

In the CDP, the population was spread out, with 23.8% under the age of 18, 7.4% from 18 to 24, 25.2% from 25 to 44, 29.2% from 45 to 64, and 14.4% who were 65 years of age or older. The median age was 41 years. For every 100 females, there were 87.0 males. For every 100 females age 18 and over, there were 90.4 males.

The median income for a household in the CDP was $28,750, and the median income for a family was $35,781. Males had a median income of $22,143 versus $30,893 for females. The per capita income for the CDP was $12,854. About 13.5% of families and 15.4% of the population were below the poverty line, including 12.1% of those under age 18 and none of those age 65 or over.

== Education ==
It is within the Pulaski County Special School District.

It is zoned to Daisy Bates Elementary School, Fuller Middle School, and Wilbur D. Mills University Studies High School.
