= West Ninth Street =

Historic Black area in West Little Rock, Arkansas

West Ninth Street was a former street area in West Little Rock, Arkansas. Although the former Black Business District and Neighborhood does not exist today, its history still survives throughout many research initiatives and the efforts of the Mosaic Templars Cultural Center, which is located in the former district.

== History: 19th-Mid 20th Century ==
West Ninth Street, formerly known as West Hazel Street until 1870, was home to a well-known African American communities in Little Rock, Arkansas (Smith, 2022). When the Union captured Little Rock in 1863, the soldiers began to establish housing for freed slaves on West Hazel Street (Smith, 2022). By the 1920s, West Ninth Street became notable for its vibrant, African American community and was termed as a Southern mecca for entertainment (Vinzant, 2004). Many of the businesses and fraternal associations for African Americans were located on this street and was known as a “city within a city” (Smith, 2022).

The physical and attempted historical erasure of West Ninth Street is one example of discrimination during the urban renewal period. West Ninth Street contained two historical buildings that were vital to the area’s rich nightlife. The earliest prominent establishment was Taborian Hall, which was one of the many dance halls on the street block (Vinzant, 2004). The Mosaic Templars Headquarters was established around 1918 as a fraternal organization for African Americans, which was especially popular for male business-owners (Smith, 2022). After the demolition from urban renewal projects, the Arkansas Flag and Banner purchased the structure and owner Robert McCoy led the renovation of the Dreamland Ballroom (Smith, 2022).

== Urban Renewal Period ==
The Federal Housing Act of 1949 enacted during the Truman administration put Little Rock’s urban renewal initiatives into motion (Kirk, 2006). During this period, many planners debated between easing the upper-middle class workers by limiting commuting between the suburbs and the office while others advocated for diminishing urban sprawl by restructuring the downtown area. During the 1940s, Little Rock’s city planners began advocating for an east-west expressway that would make it accessible to reach both sides of the city. Moreover, the Federal Highway Act issued by President Eisenhower in 1956 encouraged the development of Interstate 30 (I-30), which would later be a part of a larger project called Interstate 630 in the 1960s (Smith, 2022). After the Federal Housing Act and Federal Highway Act were passed, the Little Rock Housing Authority (LRHA) began to evaluate West Ninth Street’s urban condition. However, it was not until 1958 when West Ninth Street was declared as a “blighted area” that needed physical improvements due to structural and traffic congestion (Tell-Hall, 2019). The LHRA was the primary initiator for the demolition of West Ninth Street and forced residents out of their homes by the use of eminent domain. This resulted in citizens either selling their dwellings at the appraised price or being evicted, which allowed for more discrimination in the Little Rock region (Smith, 2022).

== Aftermath of Urban Renewal and Present ==
The West Ninth Street demolition exacerbated racial division as well as the enforcement of Jim Crow Laws, which was seen when West Ninth Street dwellers were forced to live on the outskirts of Little Rock and endured longer commute times to work, shopping, and other services (Center for Arkansas History and Culture, 2019). This effect was due to the completion of Interstate 630, now named Wilbur D. Mills Freeway, during the early 1960s (Smith, 2022). Although Interstate 630 connects western Little Rock to the center, the highway system accentuated segregation by dividing the city (University of Arkansas Center for Arkansas History and Culture, 2019). Similar to many other urban renewal projects, the razing of West Ninth Street resulted in a decrease of land-use in the area (specifically 11%) (Tell-Hall, 2019; Vance Jr., 1955). The Ninth Street Park near the Wilbur D. Freeway is named after this area but does not have any memorials dedicated to the demolition of the historic street.

Although the historic district does not exist anymore, West Ninth Street is remembered thanks to the preservation research efforts at the University of Arkansas, Little Rock and Central Arkansas Library System as well as the history and education efforts of the Mosaic Templars Cultural Center. One prominent initiative is the Lost West Ninth Street Project that exhibits before and after photos of the area on Google Earth (Smith, 2022). Even though there are regional institutions that fund research about West Ninth Street, the state government has not initiated any projects for street.

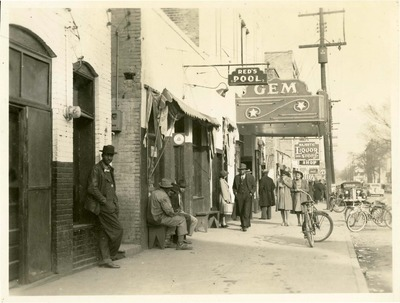

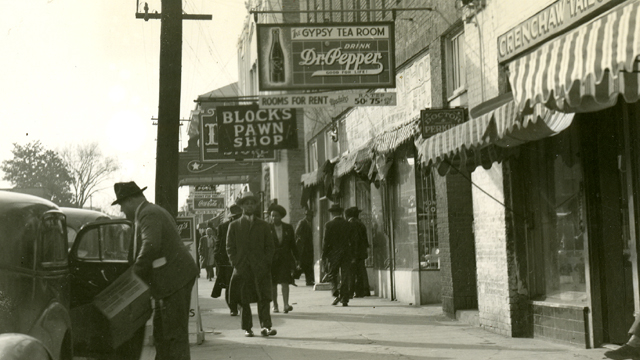

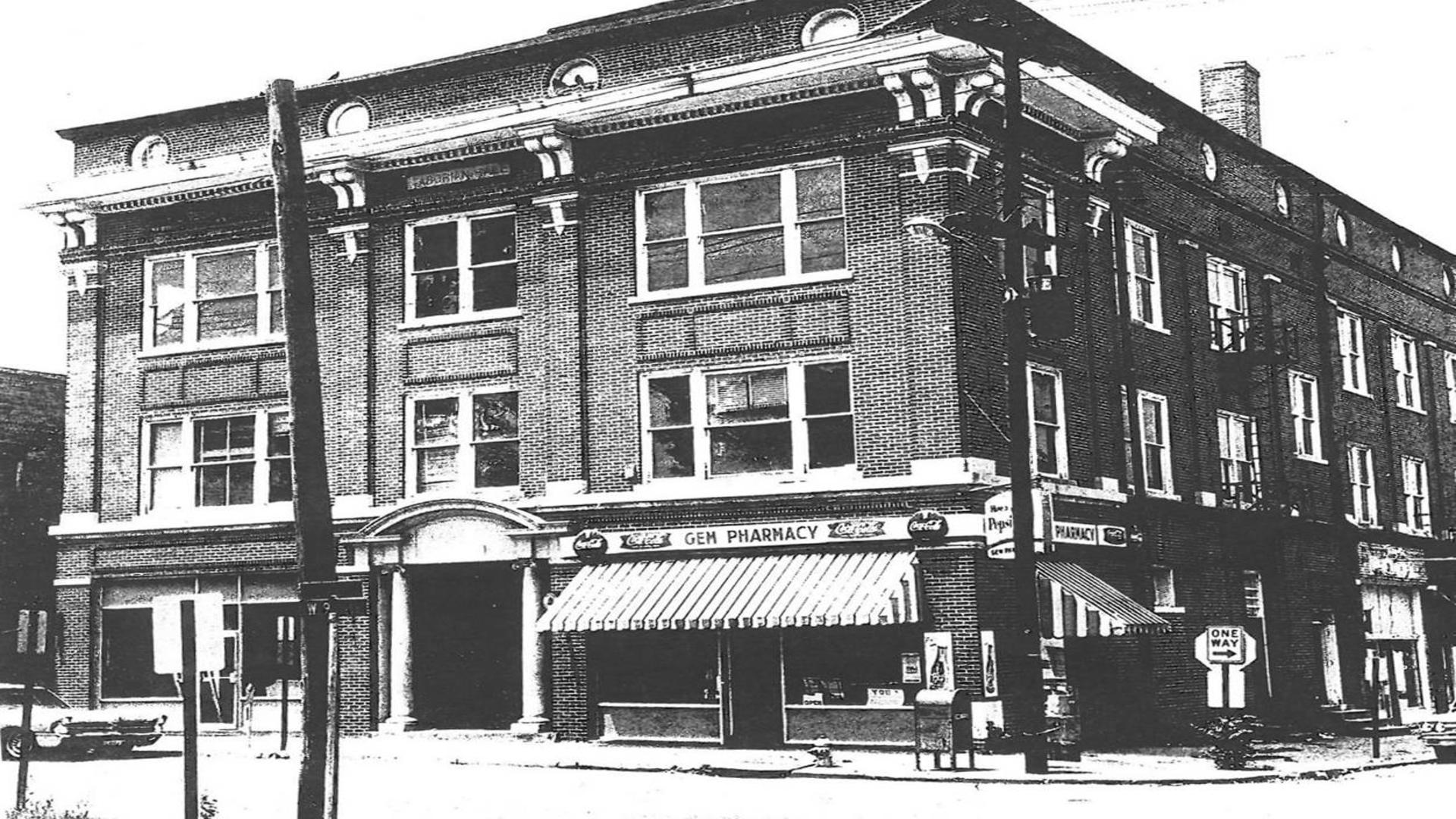

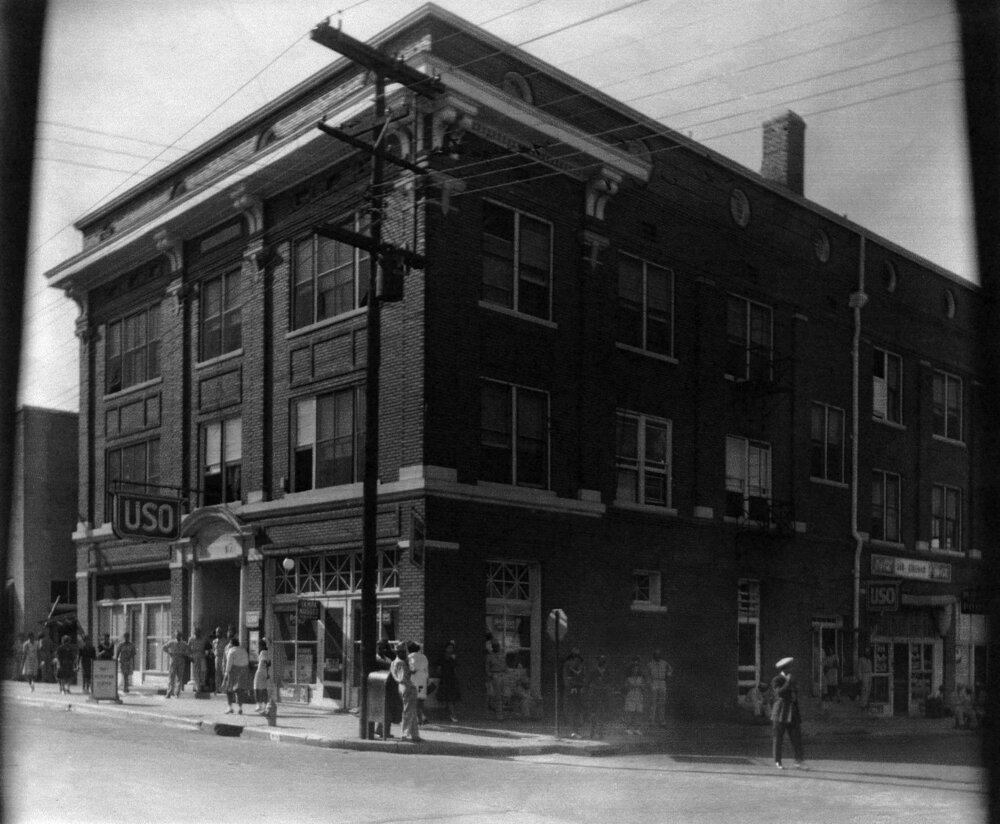
