= Dallas T. Herndon =

American archivist and author in Arkansas

Dallas Tabor Herndon (August 28, 1878 – February 21, 1953) was a teacher, archivist, and author in Arkansas, United States. According to the Encyclopedia of Arkansas, he was the first director of the Arkansas History Commission, predecessor to the Arkansas State Archives. He wrote about the history of Arkansas.

Arkansas History Commission and Its Work, readable pdf document

He lived in Mount Vernon, Arkansas. His Letters of David O. Dodd with Biographical Sketch of David O. Dodd was printed. He also wrote about the Nashville Convention of 1850 where delegates from nine states where slavery was legal met to discuss secession. The 1922 Centennial History of Arkansas said of him:

Dallas Tabor, after three years in high school at Elberton, attended, 1897-99, the Southeast Alabama Agricultural School, at Abbeville, in preparation for college; went from there to the Alabama Polytechnic Institute (Auburn), where he graduated in the class of 1902; was given a fellowship by the faculty and completed the next year graduate courses in history and political science; spent two years, 1904-05, at Barton Academy, Mobile, Alabama, as instructor of history; recalled to the Alabama Polytechnic in the fall of 1905, he was an instructor in the department of history until 1908; was given a fellowship in the University of Chicago, where he pursued, 1909-11, graduate courses in history and political science, specializing in original research; was elected secretary of the Arkansas History Commission in August, 1911, which position he has held continually since.

The High Lights of Arkansas History, readable pdf document

By 1951, health issues largely prevented Herndon from carrying forth his work. He died at a hospital in Conway, Arkansas, having committed suicide by a gunshot wound to the head, at the age of 74. His wife reported to the sheriff that she had found Herndon dead with a gun next to him, and that he had been ill. Following his death, the Arkansas legislature passed a bill designating Herndon secretary emeritus of the Arkansas History Commission.

In the 1945-1946 Arkansas Handbook his comments about the Ten Most Famous Men in Arkansas History were republished from 1937.

== Writings ==
- Centennial History of Arkansas S. J. Clarke Publishing Company (1922)
- Outline of Executive and Legislative History of Arkansas (1922)
- High Lights of Arkansas History (1922)
- Arkansas Handbook
- Why Little Rock Was Born (1933)
- Annals of Arkansas (1947)
- Letters of David O. Dodd with Biographical Sketch
- The Nashville Convention of 1850
