= A Bayou Legend =

Opera by William Grant Still

- Opera by William Grant Still
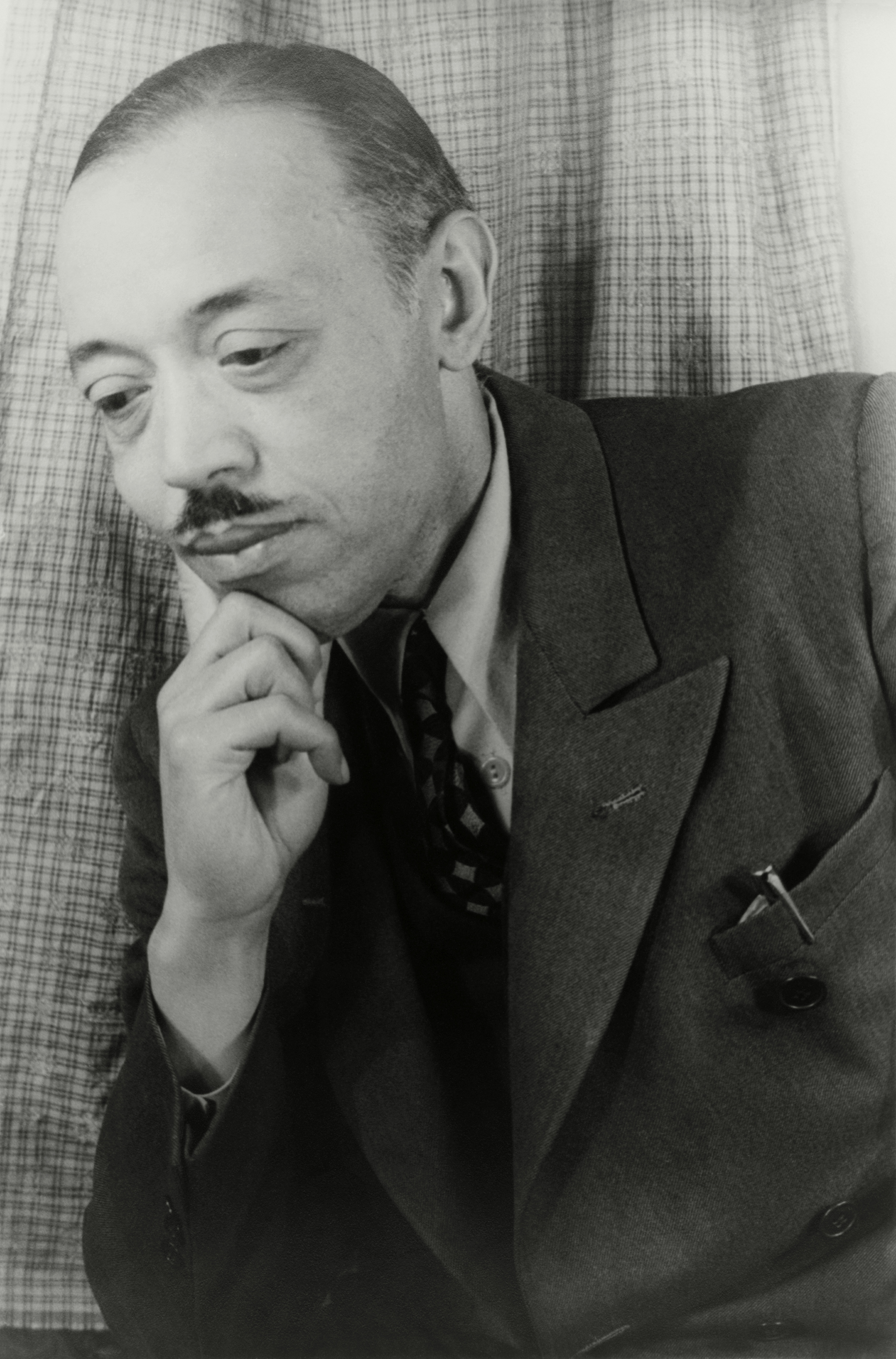
- The composer in 1949, photographed by Carl Van Vechten
- Librettist: Verna Arvey
- Language: English
- Premiere: March 31, 1974; Opera/South in Jackson, Mississippi

A Bayou Legend is an American opera composed by William Grant Still, with a libretto by his wife and frequent collaborator, Verna Arvey. The story takes place in a Creole village in the Mississippi Delta.

== Plot ==
Set in a 20th-century Creole village in the Mississippi Delta, the opera focuses on the deadly revenge that the beautiful Clothilde enacts on Bazile, a handsome young man who does not return her expressions of love. When Clothilde discovers that Bazile has been in communication with Aurore, a spirit who identifies herself as Bazile's lover from a distant era, Clothilde threatens to have Bazile arrested for violating local religious customs. When Bazile continues to refuse to wed Clothilde, she arranges for a mob to have him lynched. In his death throes, however, Bazile's soul is united with Aurore; Clothilde lives out the remainder of her years as a bitter recluse.

== Productions ==
Still composed A Bayou Legend in 1941, but it was not professionally staged until 1974, when Opera/South in Jackson, Mississippi presented its world premiere, 33 years later. The company revived the opera in 1976, and in 1979 collaborated with the Mississippi Educational Television Authority to create a made-for-television film version. Post-production problems delayed its broadcast until June 15, 1981. This marked the first time that an opera composed by an African American was broadcast on television. Leonard de Paur served as the Musical Director and Conductor.

The opera was performed in 1976 in its West Coast Premier at East Los Angeles City College, featuring a mostly African-American professional cast, including Delcina Stevenson, conducted by Calvin Simmons, directed by Gary Fisher, and designed by Donald McAfee. This production shifted the time of the setting to the 1920s.

Daniel Cariaga's review of the opera's premiere for the Los Angeles Times described it as "joyously and disarmingly melodious, dramatically effective and beautifully crafted...an attractive and poignant work."

Still's widow and author of the libretto, Verna Arvey, attended the Los Angeles production. She was given a plaque honoring William Grant Still and said that the production had fully embodied the spirit of her husband's work.

The New York Times review of the television production praised the opera as "simple but effective," and described the cast as "exceptionally handsome and talented." The production received an Emmy Award nomination for Outstanding Achievement in Lighting Direction. To date, the televised production has not been commercially released on DVD.

== Roles ==
| Role | Voice Type | Cast (1981 Television Broadcast) |
|---|---|---|
| Aurore | Soprano | Carmen Balthrop |
| Bazile | Tenor | Gary Burgess |
| Leonce | Baritone | Peter Lightfoot |
| Clothilde | Mezzo Soprano | Raeschelle Potter |
| Father Lestant | Bass | Cullen Maiden |
| Minstrel/First Blade | | Francois Clemmons |
| Second Blade | | Irwin Reese |
| Third Blade/MC | | Ben Holt |
| First Woman | | Louise Clemons |
| Second Woman | | Glennye Robinson |
| Third Woman | | Dianne Wells |
| Deacon | | Benny Reeves |
| Warden | | Louis Beverly |
| Second Man | | James Hawkins |
