= Mosaic Templars State Temple =

- U.S. National Register of Historic Places
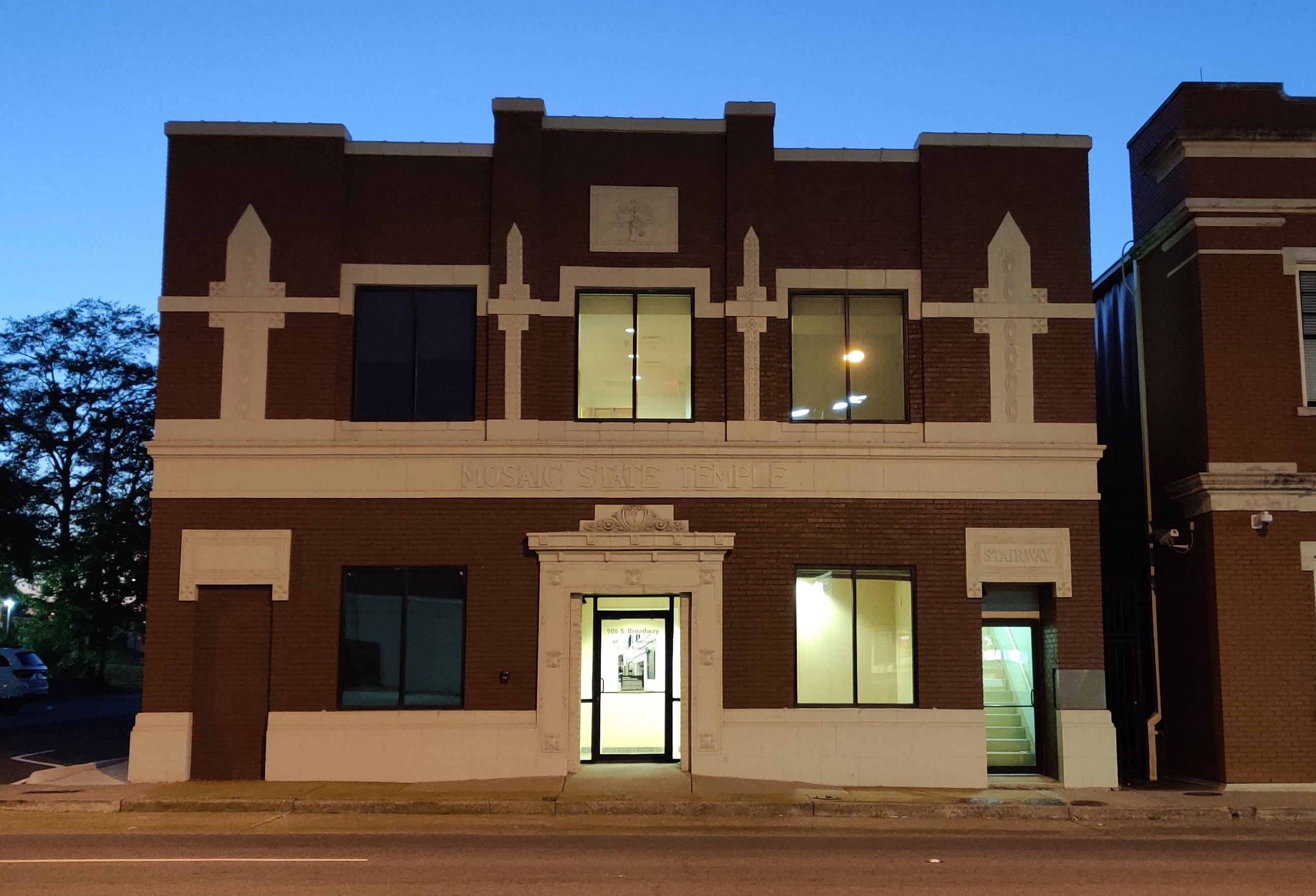

- Location within Arkansas Location within the United States
- Location: 906 S. Broadway St. Little Rock, Arkansas
- Coordinates: 34°44′27″N 92°16′36″W
- Built: 1921
- NRHP reference No.: 100002457
- Added to NRHP: May 18, 2018

The Mosaic Templars State Temple is a historic African-American fraternal benefit society building at 906 South Broadway Street in Little Rock, Arkansas. It is a two-story masonry structure, built of brick and terra cotta. The front facade is symmetrical, with ornately decorated elements rising to a parapet. It was built in 1921 to house the headquarters of the state chapter of the Mosaic Templars of America, an African-American fraternal society founded by former slaves after the American Civil War. The building was part of a complex which originally included three buildings, one of which was the organization's national headquarters; the other two buildings were destroyed by fire.

The building was listed on the National Register of Historic Places in 2018.

== See also ==
- National Register of Historic Places in Little Rock, Arkansas
