= Division of Arkansas Heritage =

Division of the Arkansas Department of Parks, Heritage, and Tourism

- Great Seal of Arkansas

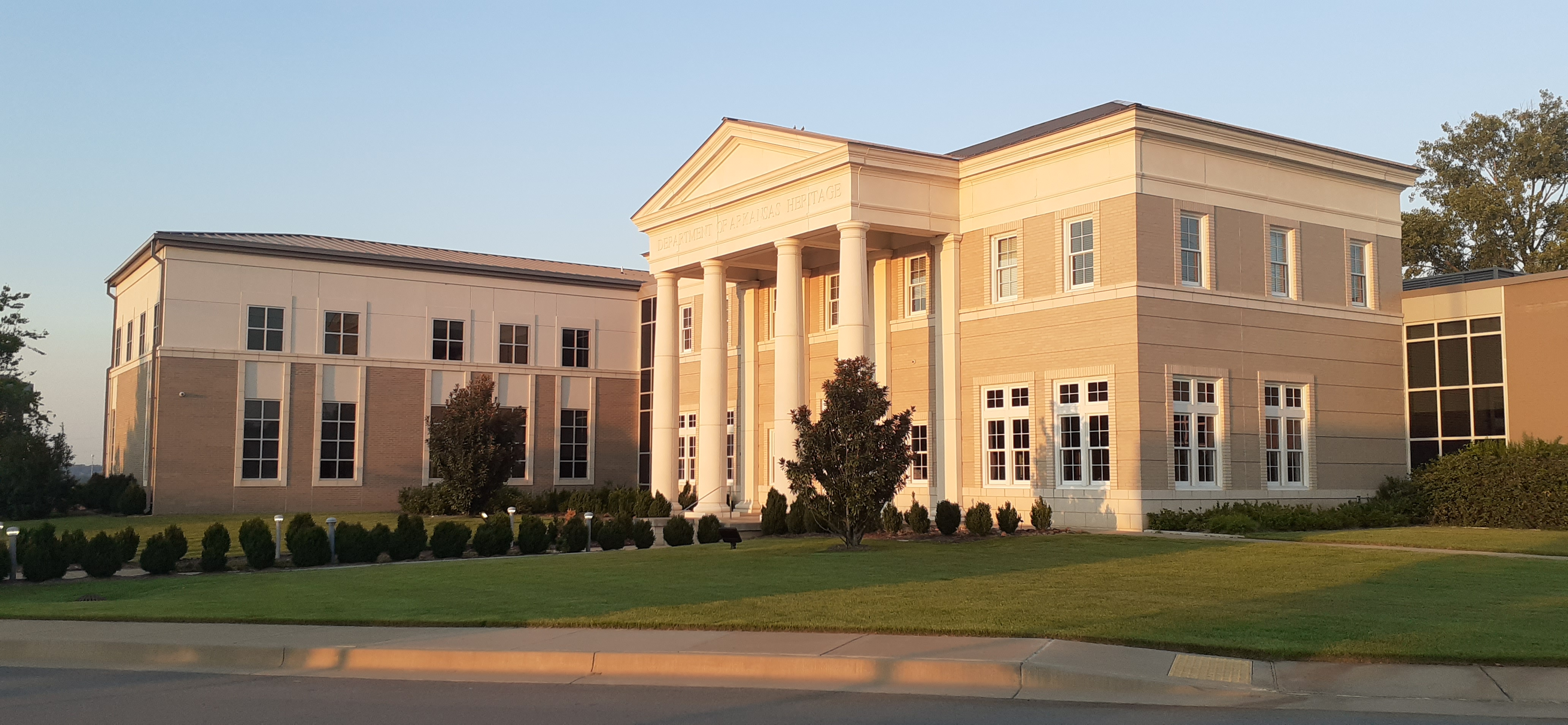

Division overview
- Formed: 1975 (50 years ago)
- Jurisdiction: Government of Arkansas
- Headquarters: 1100 North Street; Little Rock, AR 72201-1223; 34°45′7.23″N 92°16′55.37″W
- Division executive: Director, Marty Ryall
- Parent department: Arkansas Department of Parks, Heritage, and Tourism
- Child agencies: Arkansas Arts Council; Arkansas Historic Preservation Program; Arkansas Natural Heritage Commission; Arkansas State Archives; Delta Cultural Center; Historic Arkansas Museum; Mosaic Templars Cultural Center; Old State House Museum
- Website: arkansasheritage.com

The Division of Arkansas Heritage (DAH) is a division of the Arkansas Department of Parks, Heritage, and Tourism of the U.S. State of Arkansas responsible for preserving, promoting, and protecting Arkansas's natural and cultural history and heritage. It was known as the Department of Arkansas Heritage until it was merged with the Arkansas Department of Parks and Tourism (ADPT) on July 1, 2019, becoming a division of ADPT's successor, the Arkansas Department of Parks, Heritage, and Tourism.

The division is headquartered in downtown Little Rock, Arkansas along the banks of the Arkansas River. Its headquarters is about 34,000 square feet at 1100 North St. in Little Rock and includes offices, a materials and collections storage facility, a fleet-management physical plant, an herbarium, a library, and multiple meeting spaces available for public use.

The Division of Arkansas Heritage promotes Arkansas Heritage Month each May to promote Arkansas history and tourism. It began as Heritage Week in 1982 and expanded into a month-long program in 1998. Each year, DAH selects one of its various agencies to highlight during the month of May. Local entities can apply for and receive grants in order to create specific Heritage Month events, focused on the year's theme. In the past, Arkansas Heritage Month events have included historical biking tours, special exhibits in local museums or libraries, or history fairs with reenactments and historic activities.

== History ==
The impetus behind the creation of the department was to group together existing state agencies that were culturally oriented. Several legislators sponsored Act 1001 of 1975, which created the Department of Arkansas Natural and Cultural Heritage and brought together six agencies. The name was changed to the Department of Arkansas Heritage in 1985. Anne Bartley was appointed the first director of Arkansas Heritage in 1975 by Gov. David Pryor to lead the Department of Arkansas Natural and Cultural Heritage. Cathie Matthews, who held the position from 1997 until 2012, was the longest-serving director. Stacy Hurst, appointed by Governor Asa Hutchinson in January 2015, was its last director as a separate department. The present director of the Heritage division (as of 2024) is Marty Ryall.

On March 31, 2016, Arkansas Governor Asa Hutchinson created the Arkansas World War I Centennial Commemoration Committee to lead the state's remembrance of the events of 100 years ago. The committee worked with the people of Arkansas to plan activities, conduct research, and otherwise expanded the understanding and appreciation of the significance of World War I, until it was dissolved on December 31, 2018.

The Arkansas Food Hall of Fame program was founded in 2016 by the Department of Arkansas Heritage to honor the unique foods and food traditions of Arkansas. It was originally made up of four categories for nominations, Proprietor or Chef of the Year, Food-themed Event, Food Hall of Fame, and People's Choice, with a fifth category added in 2017 titled Gone But Not Forgotten. A 13-member committee selects the finalists and winners from the entries. Honorees and finalists are announced at a special ceremony every spring.

== Structure ==
The division consists of eight separate units: four heritage resource agencies and four heritage museums. The division's central office coordinates and promotes all unit efforts to make information and materials about the state readily accessible to all Arkansans through heritage and cultural events, educational resources and special publications. The common goal of all units is to seek out and protect the legacy and lore of Arkansas and what distinguishes it from other states.

The heritage resource agencies are:

- Arkansas Arts Council (AAC) seeks to advance the arts in Arkansas and provides grants for arts organizations and activities in communities across the state. ACC hosts conferences such as ArtLinks and GetSmart!. Its programs include Arkansas Living Treasure Award, Governor's Arts Awards, Small Works on Paper, Arkansas Artist Registry, and Arts in Education Roster. It was established in 1966 and became part of the Department of Arkansas Heritage in 1975. AAC is also funded in part by the National Endowment for the Arts.
- Arkansas Historic Preservation Program (AHPP) manages the state's historic and cultural resources, including properties on the National Register of Historic Places, and operates the Main Street Arkansas program, which works with local communities as a resource for revitalization and preservation. The Department of Arkansas Heritage acquired the Jacob Wolf House Site and Territorial Courthouse from the Baxter County Quorum Court in 2016. The Arkansas Historic Preservation Program operates the site with a historic site manager, offering comprehensive interpretive themes between 1829 and 1863 tied to the historic site.
- Arkansas Natural Heritage Commission (ANHC) was created by the Arkansas General Assembly in 1969 and works to conserve Arkansas's natural landscape by conducting surveys, studies, and maintaining a biodiversity database. Volunteers can assist the ANHC professional staff in surveys or educational resource guides. The commission also created an Adopt-A-Natural Area Program where individuals or organizations can take responsibility for helping ANHC maintain and monitor a specific natural area. ANHC established and maintains the Arkansas System of Natural Areas, including a central repository of rare and endangered species.
- In 2016, legislation transferred the Arkansas History Commission (AHC) from the Arkansas Department of Parks and Tourism to DAH, renaming it the Arkansas State Archives (ASA). The ASA keeps and cares for the official archives of the State of Arkansas. Arkansans across the state can access databases and historical materials for genealogy and other research, whether at the Little Rock headquarters or at one of its two branches, Northeast Arkansas Regional Archives (NEARA) and Southwest Arkansas Regional Archives (SARA). Artifacts and records from everyday Arkansans are collected and preserved through the Archives. The Black History Commission of Arkansas serves to collect materials on Arkansas's African American history for the Arkansas State Archives, working to raise awareness of the contributions of African American Arkansans.

The heritage museums are:

- The Delta Cultural Center (DCC) chronicles the life and times of the people, traditions, music, and art of the Arkansas Delta. The museum opened in 1990 in Helena–West Helena, Arkansas and was added to the Department of Arkansas Heritage the same year. Part of the center is located in the restored 1912 train depot. It's also home to the famed King Biscuit Time radio show.
- The Historic Arkansas Museum (HAM) is accredited by the American Alliance of Museums and is the state's foremost interpreter of frontier Arkansas, chronicling the social, political, and creative history of the state through the 19th century. It was the state's first history or historic site museum accredited by the AAM. The museum includes four major historic buildings on their original sites and a transplanted 1830s log cabin. The Hinderliter Tavern, built in 1827 and the oldest building in Little Rock, remains on its original site on the museum grounds. The museum also houses one of the country's best Bowie knife collections and is home to the American Bladesmith Society Hall of Fame.
- Mosaic Templars Cultural Center (MTCC) tells the story of Arkansas's African Americans from 1870 to the present. Its mission is to collect and preserve African-American history in Arkansas, highlighting achievements in education, the arts, business, and politics. The museum has housed an Arkansas Black Hall of Fame exhibit on the second floor since September 2008. Two former slaves, John E. Bush and Chester W. Keatts, founded the Mosaic Templars of America in 1882. The fraternal organization was established in Little Rock to provide services to African Americans. The organization expanded to build a three-building complex. The three-story museum stands within the historic site's original footprint after the original building burned down.
- Old State House Museum (OSHM) is the oldest standing state capitol west of the Mississippi. It emphasizes political history, women's history, and historical programming for school children. The building was added to the National Register of Historic Places in 1969 and was designated a National Historic Landmark in 1997. The building was not only Arkansas's first capitol building, but it also served as the backdrop for Bill Clinton's presidential election victory parties. It has permanent collections featuring artifacts from Arkansas's first families as well as the state's First Ladies' gowns.
