= Celeste Headlee =

American journalist (born 1969)

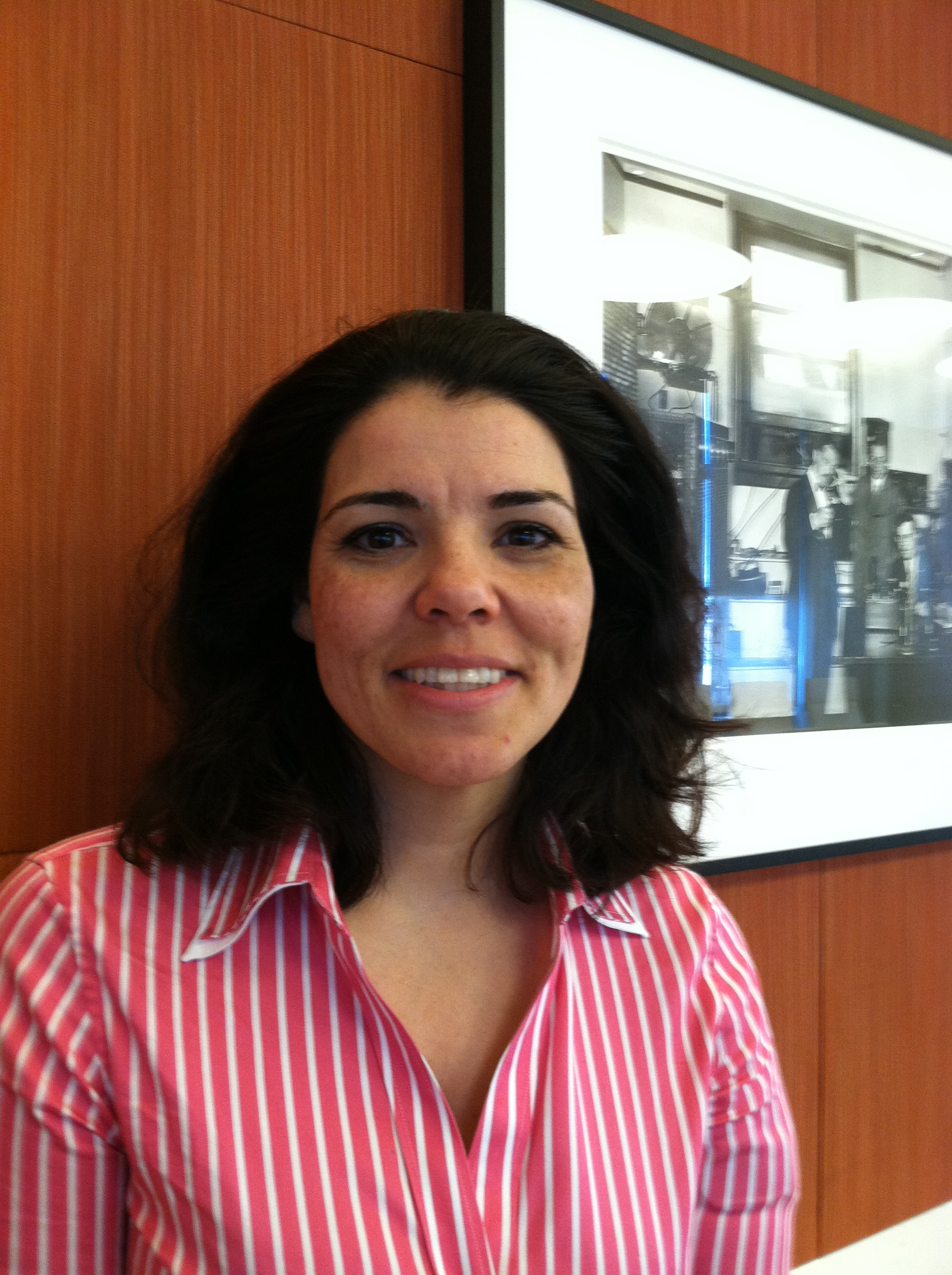
- Headlee in 2012
- Born: December 30, 1969 (age 56); Whittier, California, U.S.
- Education: Northern Arizona University, B.A. 1995; University of Michigan M.M. 1998
- Occupations: Radio journalist, author, public speaker, singer
- Relatives: William Grant Still and Verna Arvey (maternal grandparents), Carrie Still Shepperson (great-grandmother)
- Website: celesteheadlee.com

Celeste Headlee (born December 30, 1969) is an American radio journalist, author, public speaker, musician, and co-host of the weekly series Retro Report on PBS. In her 20-year career in public radio, Headlee has served as the host of the Georgia Public Broadcasting program "On Second Thought" and co-host of the national morning news show The Takeaway. Before 2009, she was the Midwest Correspondent for NPR's Day to Day and the host of a weekly show on Detroit Public Radio. Headlee is the author of We Need to Talk: How to Have Conversations That Matter (Harper Wave, September 19, 2017).

== Early life ==
Celeste Headlee was born December 30, 1969, in Whittier, California, the daughter of Judith Anne Still, a writer, and Larry Headlee, a marine geologist. Her father, a "white guy with Texas roots," is of European descent; and her maternal grandparents were the African-American composer, William Grant Still; and the Russian-Jewish pianist, Verna Arvey.

Headlee graduated from Northern Arizona University (NAU) and then received a master's degree in vocal performance from the University of Michigan.

== Journalism career ==
Headlee began her career as a journalist as an anchor and writer with Arizona Public Radio station KNAU in Flagstaff in 1999 and as an on-air personality with Flagstaff station KVNA. In 2001, she became a reporter and anchor for WDET-FM, Detroit Public Radio, hosting a weekly one-hour program called Front Row Center. In 2006 she began working for National Public Radio, developing stories, covering breaking news, and producing long-form features. Headlee was the Midwest Correspondent for NPR's Day to Day and her news reports have aired on NPR, Public Radio International, the Pacifica Network, the Great Lakes Radio Consortium, and National Native News.

From 2009 to August 2012, Headlee was the host (along with John Hockenberry) of The Takeaway, a live national morning news program produced by Public Radio International and WNYC New York. In December 2017, it was revealed that she was one of many female former Takeaway cohosts who had left the program as a result of having allegedly been subjected to bullying and disrespect by Hockenberry. Other women associated with the program also came forward with similar accounts, as well as allegations of sexual harassment.

In late 2012, she started acting as an occasional guest host on NPR's Tell Me More, and a guest host in the absence of the late Neal Conan on Talk of the Nation. Both shows are no longer on the air.

In 2014, she launched On Second Thought on Georgia Public Broadcasting. The hour-long public radio show focuses on local and national news as it relates to Georgia and the South.

Headlee is currently the cohost of Retro Report on PBS.

In 2021, Headlee began substitute co-hosting on NPR and WBUR's Here and Now.

== Journalism awards ==
Headlee has won awards from the Michigan AP, the Michigan Association of Broadcasters, and the Metro Detroit Society of Professional Journalists. Headlee serves as a mentor and managing editor for NPR's Next Generation Project, which is aimed at training young broadcast journalists. While living in Arizona, she was a member of the Artists' Roster for the Arizona Commission on the Arts. In 2011 she was named a Getty Arts Journalism Fellow by USC's Annenberg School of Journalism.

== Writing ==
Headlee's 2017 book We Need to Talk: How to Have Conversations That Matter is based on a May 2015 TEDx talk that she gave in Savannah, and covers ways for people to improve their communication skills. She also covers relevant research in the book and helps people create strategies for their conversations.

Her book Do Nothing (2020) discusses ways that software is designed to keep people anxious that they are not productive enough in their own lives. In the book, Headlee asserts the importance of leisure time and connecting genuinely with other people.

Headlee's 2021 book Speaking of Race: Why Everybody Needs to Talk About Racism—and How to Do It was well received. Kirkus Reviews called it "A cogent explanation of why respect and acceptance should ground conversations about race." Publishers Weekly said that "Headlee offers helpful advice on how to fight racism through "lots and lots of short, low-stakes conversations.""

== Musical education and career ==
A classically trained soprano, Headlee graduated from the Idyllwild Arts Academy (part of the Idyllwild Arts Foundation) in 1987 and received a B.A. in Vocal Performance at Northern Arizona University in 1993, graduating with honors. Headlee received her Master of Music in Vocal Performance from the University of Michigan in 1998, studying with Freda Herseth, Leslie Guinn, and George Shirley, and has studied song interpretation with Martin Katz. Headlee has performed at the National Gallery of Art, Butler Center for Arkansas Studies, the Distinguished Artist Series at the Church of the Red Rocks, Colorado College, the Detroit Institute of Arts, Yavapai College, Wagner College and Wayne State University, among other venues. She also performed with such companies as the Michigan Opera Theater, the Sedona Repertory Company, the Harlequin Players (in Olympia, Washington), the Sedona Arts Center, and the Great Lakes Lyric Opera.

== Personal life ==
Headlee has two children.

Headlee is the granddaughter of composer William Grant Still. Headlee frequently performs Still's music in concerts and recitals and sang Still's composition "Levee Land" on the CD produced by the Northern Arizona University Wind Symphony. She has given many lectures about Still's music at high schools and universities and was the editor of the second edition of the book, William Grant Still and the Fusion of Cultures in American Music, for which she compiled the first complete thematic catalog of Still's works.
