= Museum of Black Arkansans and Performing Arts Center =

Historic church in Arkansas, United States

- First Baptist Church
- U.S. National Register of Historic Places
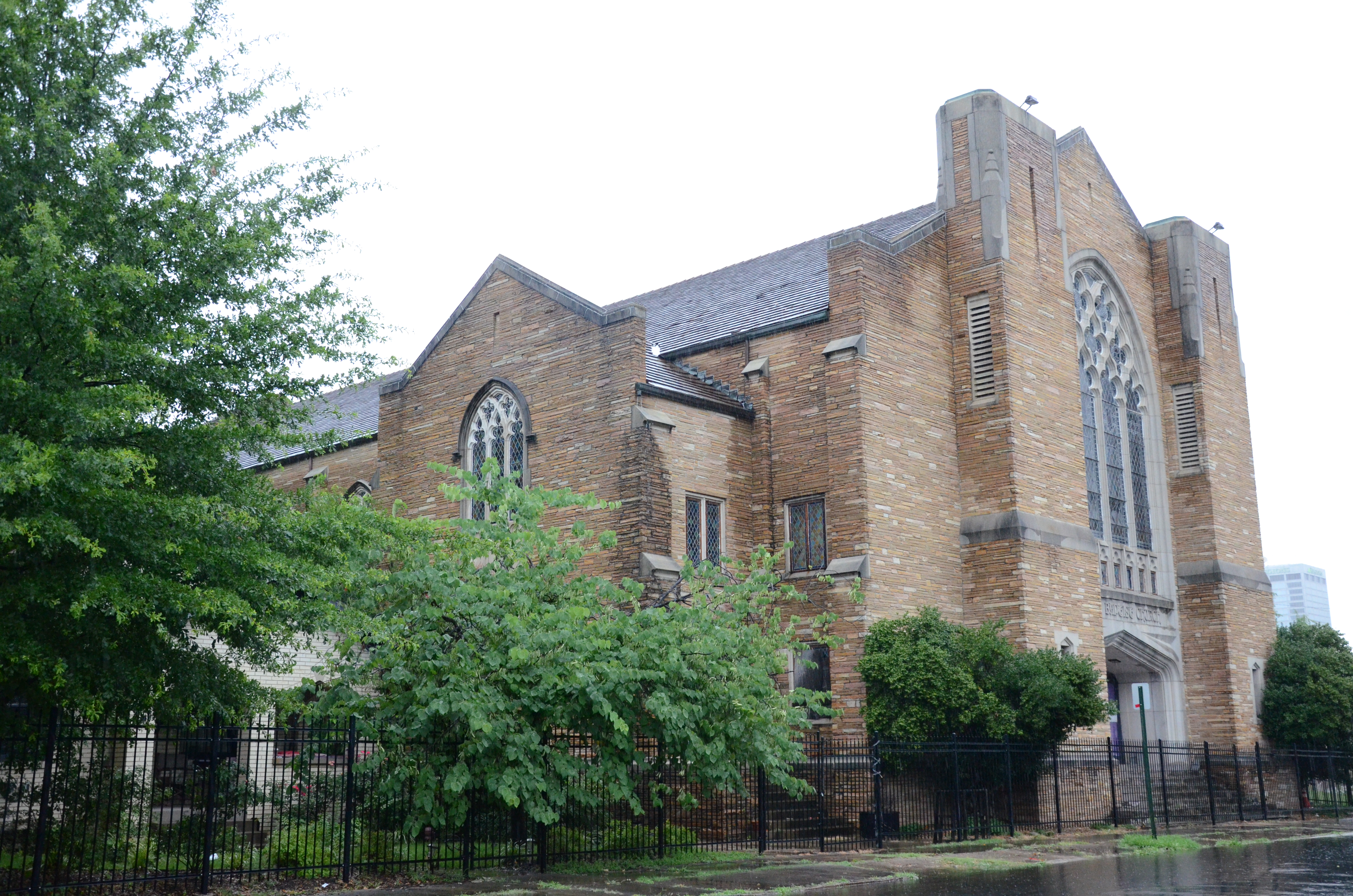

- Location within Arkansas Location within the United States
- Location: Jct. of 12th and Louisiana Sts., SW corner, Little Rock, Arkansas
- Coordinates: 34°44′14″N 92°16′26″W
- Area: less than one acre
- Built: 1941
- Architect: A. N. McAninch
- Architectural style: Late Gothic Revival
- NRHP reference No.: 94000823
- Added to NRHP: August 9, 1994

The Museum of Black Arkansans and Performing Arts Center is a museum and performing arts venue at 1224 South Louisiana Street in Little Rock, Arkansas. It is located on the former campus of the First Baptist Church of Little Rock, an historic property listed on the National Register of Historic Places in 1994. The former church, built in 1941, is a prominent local example of Collegiate Gothic architecture, designed by local architect A. N. McAninch. Little Rock's First Baptist congregation now meets at 62 Pleasant Valley Drive.

== Mission ==
The museum was established in 1993 by Ernie Dodson, and was first known as "Ernie's Museum of Black Arkansans", and is still often referred to by the acronym EMOBA. Its stated mission is to "promote awareness of Arkansas’s black history and to create unity and personal pride within the community, schools, colleges, and universities by recognizing those black Arkansans who were the first or best in their fields, showcasing how black struggles and achievements have influenced the development of Arkansas. It is working to develop a performing arts theater to highlight and train African-American artists." It is open by appointment.

== See also ==
- National Register of Historic Places listings in Little Rock, Arkansas
