= Capital Hill Colored School =

School

- Little Rock, Arkansas; United States

Information
- Type: High school
- Established: 1853

Capital Hill Colored School, also known as Capital Hill School, was a school for African American students in Little Rock, Arkansas at Eleventh Street and Wolfe Street. An engraving was made of the school. It served students up through high school.

The first public school opened in Little Rock in 1853.

In 1876, after graduating high school, John Edward Bush was appointed principal. Two years later he moved to Hot Springs, Arkansas. Mrs. L. E. Stephens served as principal. Erma P. Kelly and J. K. Rector also served as principals of the school.

A brick school building was constructed for the school in 1886. In 1901, a six-room addition to the school was documented.

Carrie Fambro Still, mother of William Grant Still taught at the school. She also organized events for the school including a fundraiser for a school library. The city's public library was segregated and did not allow admittance of African Americans.

Arsenal and Union were other high school for African Americans in Little Rock.

Capital Hill is a neighborhood in Little Rock.

At age 14, musician Florence Price graduated from the school and was its valedictorian.
