= Verna Arvey =

American journalist

Verna Arvey (February 16, 1910 – November 22, 1987) was an American librettist, pianist and writer who is best known for her musical collaborations with her husband William Grant Still, a musician and composer.

== Early life and education ==
Verna Arvey was born in Los Angeles, the daughter of Bessie (Tark) and David Arvey. Her parents were Russian Jewish immigrants. She attended local schools and the Manual Arts High School. She had started playing piano as a child. After graduating, Arvey enjoyed a brief career as a concert pianist, including performances as a soloist with Raymond Paige's CBS Network orchestra and the Los Angeles Philharmonic Orchestra.

Arvey met William Grant Still in 1930, when Still travelled to Los Angeles to revive his friendship with the composer Harold Bruce Forsythe. Forsythe likely asked her to read some of his piano music. Still tried twice to get her to perform his pieces, first Africa, then Four Negro Dances. The two became more acquainted, but as Forsythe and Arvey had been friends for many years (since they had both gone to Manual Arts High School), some jealousy ensued.

== Marriage and family ==
Arvey married Still in 1939. She was of Russian Jewish heritage and Still was African American, but their interracial union (unusual for a high-profile couple of the era) did not appear to damage their careers. The couple had two children. They were married until Still's death in 1978.

Arvey's granddaughter is journalist Celeste Headlee.

== Musical career ==
Arvey's first collaboration with Still came in 1939 when Langston Hughes, the original librettist for his opera Troubled Island, left the country before the project was completed. Arvey wrote the lyrics for three arias. She became the librettist for his subsequent operatic work, most notably A Bayou Legend, A Southern Interlude, Costaso and Mota.

As a writer on music, Arvey published articles for The New York Times and several music industry publications, including Etude, Musical Courier, Opera, Concert and Symphony, Musical America, Chesterian (London), American Dancer, Ritmo (Madrid), Musical Digest and American Mercury.

== Works ==
She also wrote books, including the following:

- 1939 monograph, Studies of Contemporary American Composers: William Grant Still
- 1941, Choreographic Music
- 1984, biography of her late husband, In One Lifetime (Fayetteville: University of Arkansas Press).
