= Mosaic Templars of America =

Black fraternal order founded in 1883

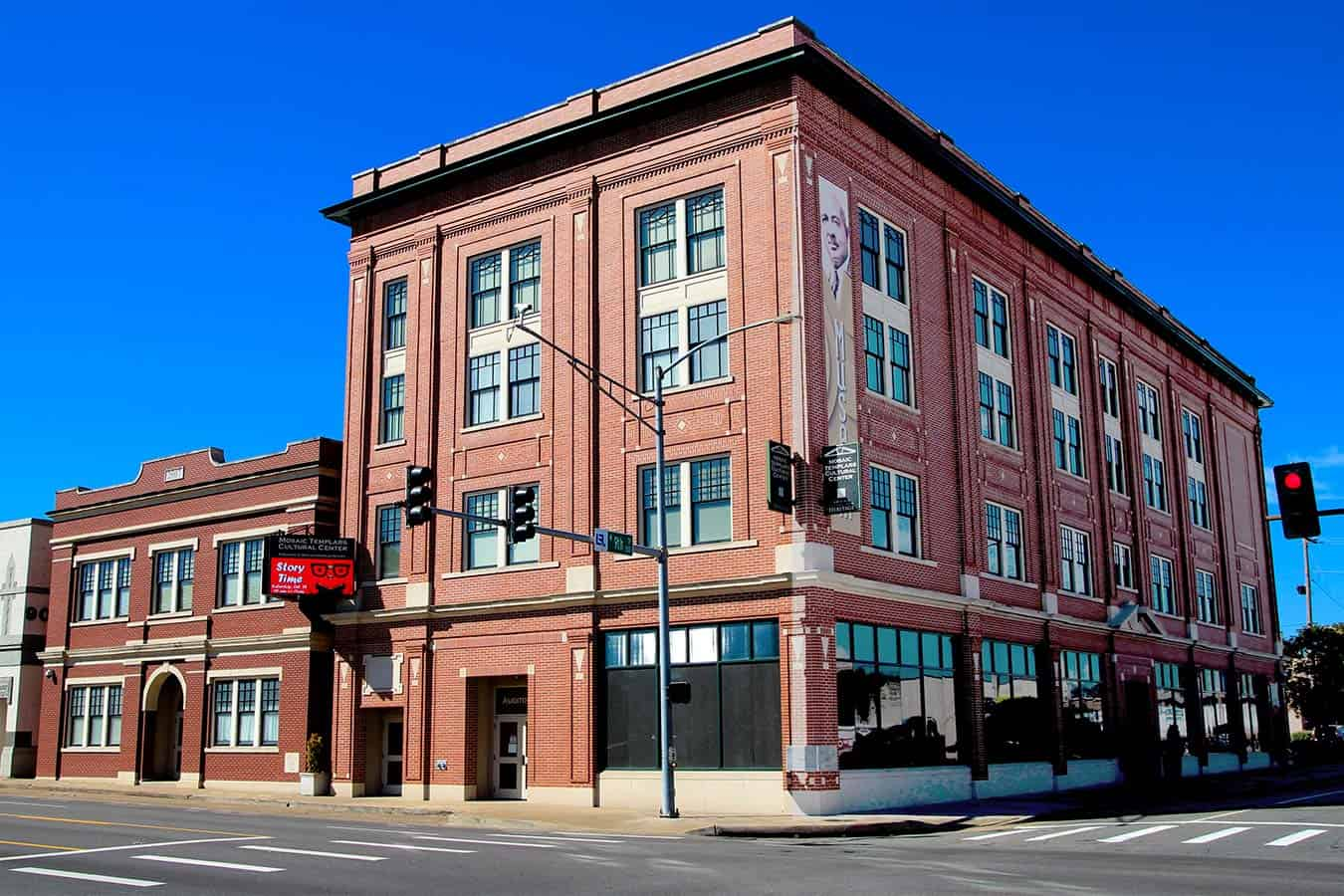
Mosaic Templars Cultural Center at Ninth Street and Broadway in Little Rock, Arkansas

The Mosaic Templars of America was a black fraternal order founded by John E. Bush and Chester W. Keatts, two former slaves, in Little Rock, Arkansas, in 1883. The organization originally provided illness, death, and burial insurance during an era when few basic services were available to black people.

According to the lore of the Mosaic Templars of America, happenstance led to the founding. John E. Bush and a white acquaintance were standing on the corner of Ninth and Broadway in Little Rock, when an elderly black women requested a donation to help with the final expenses of her husband. Bush was moved to act upon the request. He met with a close friend, Chester W. Keatts, and the two had the idea to form Mosaic Templars of America. The name metaphorically linked the organization's services to African Americans and the oppressive conditions of the Jim Crow South to Moses' leadership during the Israelites exodus from slavery in Egypt and into the Promised Land.

By 1900 Mosaic Templars' industries grew to include an insurance company, a building and loan association, a publishing company, a business college, a nursing school, and a hospital. By the end of 1922 the MTA had 87,069 members.

The MTA's goal was "to unite fraternally all persons of African descent of good character of every profession, business and occupation and to give all possible moral and material aid in its power to its members." It did not interfere with the political and religious opinions of its members. In 1923 the group's "Acting Grand Scribe" wrote to Arthur Preuss saying that "not as much stress is laid on the secret side of the organization as the business side."

By 1905 it had lodges across the state and thousands of members. Its headquarters were housed in a handsome new building that opened in 1913 at Ninth and Broadway in Little Rock, Arkansas; Booker T. Washington delivered the dedication speech. In the 1920s it claimed chapters in twenty-six states and six foreign countries, making it one of the largest black organizations in the world.

In the 1930s, the MTA began to feel the effects of the Great Depression and eventually ceased operations. However, a single chapter remains, in Barbados. The site of the organization's former headquarters is now home to the Mosaic Templars Cultural Center.
