= John E. Bush (Mosaic Templars of America) =

American businessman, teacher and politician (1856–1916)

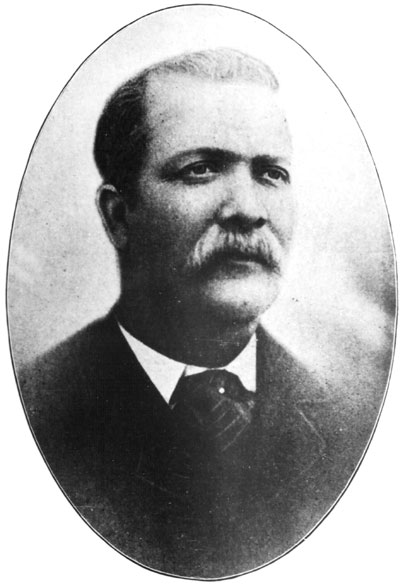
John E. Bush

John Edward Bush (1856–1916) was an American businessman, teacher, and politician. He co-founded the Mosaic Templars of America. He was a leader in the Republican Party.

== Early life ==
Bush was born in Moscow, Tennessee in 1856, he was enslaved at birth. Shortly after the outbreak of the U.S. Civil War, when large numbers of slaves were sent further south ahead of the advance of the Union Army, young Bush and his mother were taken to Arkansas. He grew up in a one-room cottage and was one of 12 children. His mother was a nurse and spent comparatively little time at home. Food was uncertain, and the children largely put to their wits to get enough. His mother struggled to give her children an education, and Bush received relatively little formal schooling.

== Career ==
As soon as he was able to do work and until he was fifteen, he was apprenticed to a brick-maker. He learned this trade and then went to teaching school in the country districts. It was while he was a teacher there and elsewhere that he obtained most of his book knowledge.

It was while he was still a teacher in the country schools that he made his first great business venture. He bought a lot for $150, promising to pay for it in installments of $10 per month. Worried that he might lose his investment if something prevented him from making the payments, Bush scrimped and saved to pay the property off in six months, when he was 19 years old. Soon after, he built a house on the property and got married. By this time he had become a teacher in the Capitol Hill School, but he lost his job immediately after he was married.

He worked for a time in Hot Springs, then returned in 1884 to run for county clerk. He was unsuccessful, possibly because of election fraud. He was compelled to go back as a school teacher into the country again. After this he was appointed railway postal clerk. He was in the mail service about ten years. At this time he began actively trading in real estate.

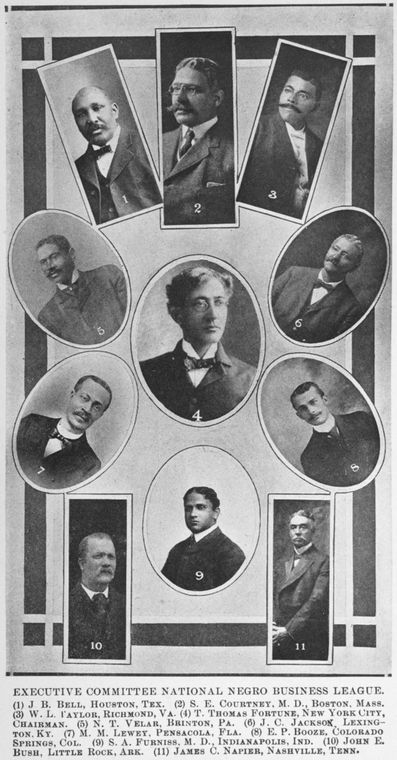
National Negro Business League portraits (1907)

Bush lost his position in the mail service when Democrat Grover Cleveland was elected president. He went back to teaching school again. At the time of his discharge he was superintendent of mails at Little Rock. After this he returned to the profession of teaching and taught for several years until under President Benjamin Harrison he was appointed Receiver of the United States General Land Office.

In association with Chester W. Keatts, Bush organized a mutual benefit and benevolent organization, known as the Mosaic Templars of America.

Bush was a significant landowner in the city of Little Rock and its suburbs. He lived at 16th Street and Chester Street.
