= List of hospitals in Arkansas =

List of hospitals in Arkansas (U.S. state), sorted by hospital name.

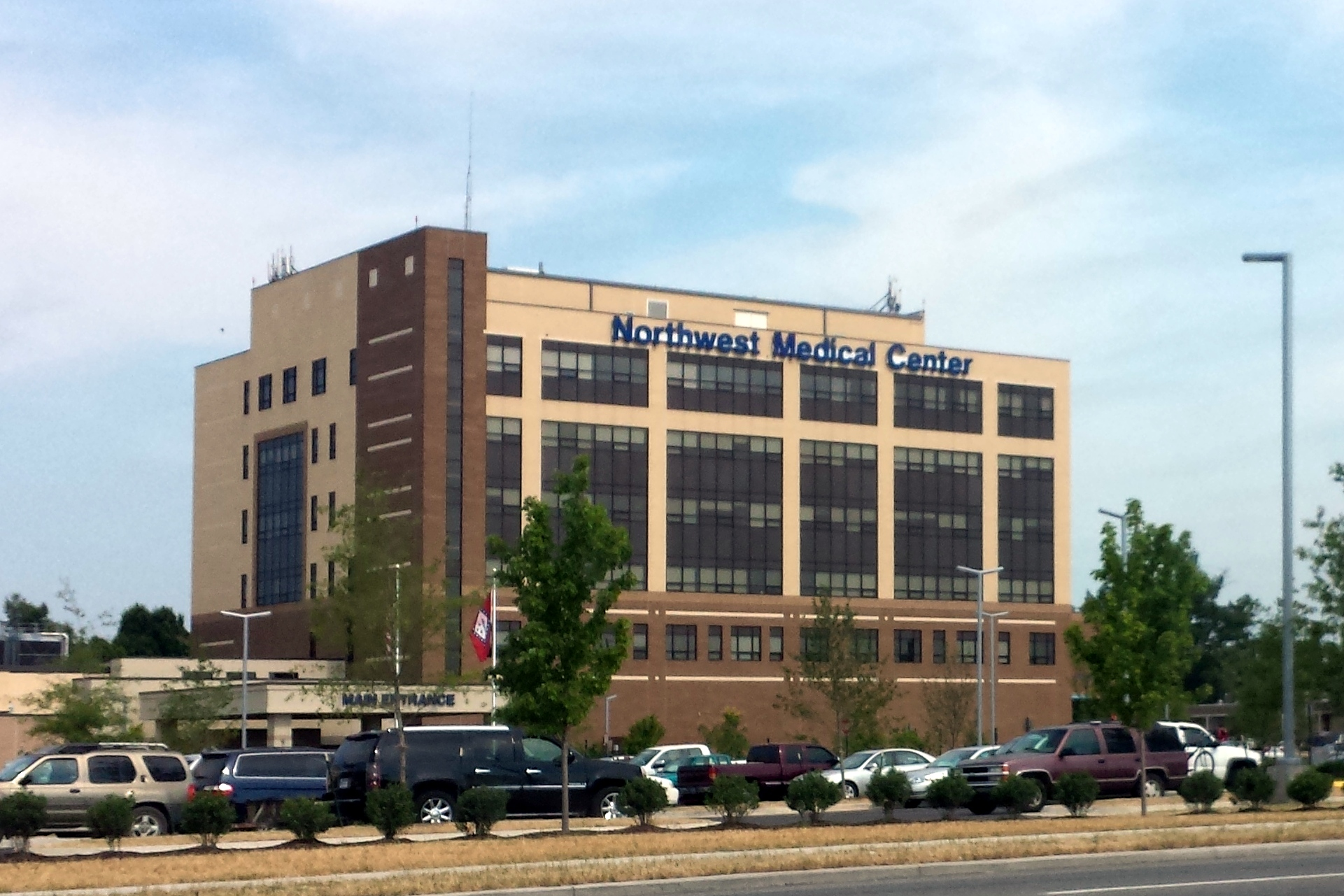
Northwest Medical Center, Springdale, Arkansas

- Advanced Care Hospital of White County - Searcy, Arkansas
- Arkansas Children's Hospital - Little Rock, Arkansas
- Arkansas Children's Northwest Hospital -Springdale, Arkansas
- Arkansas Heart Hospital - Little Rock, Arkansas
- Arkansas Methodist Medical Center - Paragould, Arkansas
- Arkansas State Psychiatric Hospital - Little Rock, Arkansas
- Arkansas Surgical Hospital - North Little Rock, Arkansas
- Ashley County Medical Center - Crossett, Arkansas
- Baptist Health Extended Care Hospital - Little Rock, Arkansas
- Baptist Health Medical Center - Arkadelphia, Arkansas
- Baptist Health Medical Center - Conway, Arkansas
- Baptist Health Medical Center - Fort Smith, Arkansas
- Baptist Health Medical Center - Heber Springs, Arkansas
- Baptist Health Medical Center - Little Rock, Arkansas
- Baptist Health Medical Center - Malvern, Arkansas
- Baptist Health Medical Center - North Little Rock, Arkansas
- Baptist Health Medical Center - Stuttgart, Arkansas
- Baptist Health Medical Center - Van Buren, Arkansas
- Baptist Health Rehabilitation Institute - Little Rock, Arkansas
- Baptist Memorial Hospital - West Memphis, Arkansas
- Baxter Regional Medical Center - Mountain Home, Arkansas
- Bradley County Medical Center - Warren, Arkansas
- BridgeWay Hospital - North Little Rock, Arkansas
- Carroll Regional Medical Center - Berryville, Arkansas
- Central Arkansas Veterans Healthcare System - Little Rock, Arkansas
- Chambers Medical Center - Danville, Arkansas
- CHI St. Vincent Hospital - Hot Springs, Arkansas
- CHI St. Vincent Hospital - Morrilton, Arkansas
- CHI St. Vincent Infirmary - Little Rock, Arkansas
- CHI St. Vincent North Hospital - Sherwood, Arkansas
- CHI St. Vincent Rehabilitation Hospital - Sherwood, Arkansas
- Chicot Memorial Medical Center - Lake Village, Arkansas
- Christus Dubuis Hospital - Fort Smith, Arkansas
- Christus Dubuis Hospital - Hot Springs, Arkansas
- Conway Regional Medical Center - Conway, Arkansas
- Conway Regional Rehabilitation Hospital - Conway, Arkansas
- Cornerstone Specialty Hospital - Little Rock, Arkansas
- Crossridge Community Hospital - Wynne, Arkansas
- Dallas County Medical Center - Fordyce, Arkansas
- De Queen Medical Center - De Queen, Arkansas
- Delta Memorial Hospital - Dumas, Arkansas
- DeWitt Hospital - DeWitt, Arkansas
- Drew Memorial Hospital - Monticello, Arkansas
- Encompass Health Rehabilitation Hospital - Fayetteville, Arkansas
- Encompass Health Rehabilitation Hospital - Fort Smith, Arkansas
- Encompass Health Rehabilitation Hospital - Jonesboro, Arkansas
- Eureka Springs Hospital - Eureka Springs, Arkansas
- Five Rivers Medical Center - Pocahontas, Arkansas
- Forrest City Medical Center - Forrest City, Arkansas
- Fulton County Hospital - Salem, Arkansas
- Great River Medical Center - Blytheville, Arkansas
- Harris Hospital - Newport, Arkansas
- Helena Regional Medical Center - Helena, Arkansas
- Howard Memorial Hospital - Nashville, Arkansas
- Izard County Medical Center - Calico Rock, Arkansas
- Jefferson Regional Medical Center - Pine Bluff, Arkansas
- John L. McClellan Memorial Veterans Hospital - Little Rock, Arkansas
- Johnson Regional Medical Center - Clarksville, Arkansas
- Lawrence Memorial Hospital - Walnut Ridge, Arkansas
- Levi Hospital - Hot Springs, Arkansas
- Little River Memorial Hospital - Ashdown, Arkansas
- Magnolia Regional Medical Center - Magnolia, Arkansas
- McGehee Hospital - McGehee, Arkansas
- Medical Center of South Arkansas - El Dorado, Arkansas
- Mena Regional Health System - Mena, Arkansas
- Methodist Behavioral Hospital - Maumelle, Arkansas
- Mercy Emergency Department - Bella Vista, Arkansas
- Mercy Hospital Berryville - Berryville, Arkansas
- Mercy Hospital Booneville - Booneville, Arkansas
- Mercy Hospital Fort Smith - Fort Smith, Arkansas
- Mercy Hospital Hot Springs - Hot Springs, Arkansas
- Mercy Hospital Northwest Arkansas - Rogers, Arkansas
- Mercy Hospital Northwest Arkansas - Springdale, Arkansas (Opening 2019)
- Mercy Hospital Ozark - Ozark, Arkansas
- Mercy Hospital Paris - Paris, Arkansas
- Mercy Hospital Waldron - Waldron, Arkansas
- Mercy Orthopedic Hospital - Fort Smith, Arkansas
- Mena Medical Center - Mena, Arkansas
- National Park Medical Center - Hot Springs, Arkansas
- NEA Baptist Memorial Hospital - Jonesboro, Arkansas
- North Arkansas Regional Medical Center - Harrison, Arkansas
- North Metro Medical Center - Jacksonville, Arkansas
- Northwest Health Emergency Department - Fayetteville, Arkansas (Opening Fall of 2019)
- Northwest Health Physicians' Specialty Hospital - Fayetteville, Arkansas
- Northwest Medical Center Behavioral Health Unit - Springdale, Arkansas
- Northwest Medical Center - Bentonville, Arkansas
- Northwest Medical Center - Springdale, Arkansas
- Northwest Medical Center - Willow Creek Women's Hospital - Johnson, Arkansas
- Ouachita County Medical Center - Camden, Arkansas
- Ozark Health Medical Center - Clinton, Arkansas
- Ozarks Community Hospital - Gravette, Arkansas
- Parkhill The Clinic for Women - Fayetteville, Arkansas
- Piggott Community Hospital - Piggott, Arkansas
- Pinnacle Pointe Hospital - Little Rock, Arkansas
- Rebsamen Regional Medical Center - Jacksonville, Arkansas
- Regency Hospital - Springdale, Arkansas
- Rivendell Behavioral Health Services - Benton, Arkansas
- River Valley Medical Center - Dardanelle, Arkansas
- Riverview Behavioral Health - Texarkana, Arkansas
- NEA Medical Center - Jonesboro, Arkansas
- Saint Mary's Regional Medical Center - Russellville, Arkansas
- Saline Memorial Hospital - Benton, Arkansas
- Select Specialty Hospital - Fort Smith, Arkansas
- Siloam Springs Regional Hospital - Siloam Springs, Arkansas
- South Mississippi County Regional Medical Center - Osceola, Arkansas
- Springwoods Behavioral Health Hospital - Fayetteville, Arkansas
- St. Anthony's Healthcare Center - Morrilton, Arkansas
- St. Bernards Behavioral Health Hospital - Jonesboro, Arkansas
- St. Bernards Medical Center - Jonesboro, Arkansas
- Stone County Medical Center - Mountain View, Arkansas
- Surgical Hospital of Jonesboro - Jonesboro, Arkansas
- University of Arkansas for Medical Sciences - UAMS Medical Center - Little Rock, Arkansas
- Valley Behavioral Health System - Barling, Arkansas
- Vantage Point Behavioral Health Hospital - Fayetteville, Arkansas
- Veterans Health Care System of the Ozarks - Fayetteville, Arkansas
- Wadley Regional Medical Center - Fort Smith, Arkansas
- Wadley Regional Medical Center - Hope, Arkansas
- Washington Regional Medical Center - Fayetteville, Arkansas
- White County Medical Center - Searcy, Arkansas
- White River Medical Center - Batesville, Arkansas
