= UAMS College of Medicine =

Medical school of the University of Arkansas

- Type: Public
- Established: 1879
- Parent institution: University of Arkansas for Medical Sciences
- Dean: Steven A. Webber, MBChB, MRCP
- Faculty: 1,844
- Students: 690
- Location: Little Rock, Arkansas, U.S. 34°44′53″N 92°19′15″W
- Campus: 84; Urban
- Website: medicine.uams.edu

UAMS College of Medicine is a medical school that is part of the University of Arkansas for Medical Sciences, a state-run university in the U.S. state of Arkansas and part of the University of Arkansas System. The primary campus is in Little Rock and is affiliated with UAMS Medical Center, Arkansas Children's Hospital, and Central Arkansas Veterans Healthcare System. A branch campus, UAMS Northwest is in Fayetteville. It is one of three medical schools in Arkansas, with NYITCOM in Jonesboro and Arkansas College of Osteopathic Medicine in Fort Smith being the other two.

== History ==
The University of Arkansas College of Medicine was founded in October, 1879 by eight Arkansas physicians, led by Dr. P. O. Hooper of Little Rock. The physicians pooled $5,000 to acquire the former Sperindo Restaurant and Hotel in downtown Little Rock, the first location of the medical school at that time known as the Medical Department of Arkansas Industrial University (later renamed University of Arkansas). The medical school was housed in several locations during the early 20th century, including the Old State House, the former Arkansas State Capitol, before using funding provided by Franklin D. Roosevelt's Public Works Administration and an Arkansas tax on beer and liquor to build a new campus in 1935 next to the Little Rock City Hospital.

In 1951, Arkansas Governor Sid McMath used cigarette tax funds to construct a new University Hospital and education facilities on a 26-acre site on West Markham Street in what was then the outskirts of Little Rock. The College of Medicine moved to this location in 1956 when construction on the new University of Arkansas Medical Center was completed and remains there today. A new Medical Center replaced the old University Hospital in 2009. Since 1956 the UAMS College of Medicine and medical center have expanded from a medical school with a charity hospital to a large academic health center with numerous related health colleges and research institutes.

== Northwest Arkansas Campus Expansion ==
In 2006, due to rising healthcare demand in the state of Arkansas, UAMS and the College of Medicine began looking for appropriate ways to expand their campus and address the shortage of physicians and healthcare professionals in Arkansas. With medical enrollment at the Little Rock campus at capacity for third and fourth year rotations, a satellite campus was proposed in Fayetteville, Arkansas at the site of the former Washington Regional Medical Center. The proximity to the main campus of the University of Arkansas and a rapidly growing region of the state with modern healthcare facilities were promoted as significant benefits to the Northwest Arkansas location, and the official announcement and political campaign for the location began on June 13, 2006. Approval was granted by state officials in December 2007, and a fundraising campaign for necessary facility renovations was initiated, with the initial $3 million goal reached in November 2008. Phase 1 of the renovations provided new classroom, student, and administrative space and was completed in 2009. Phase 2 included additional classrooms, teaching laboratories, and distance learning resources to connect with the Little Rock campus and was completed in 2011.

Students attend their first two years of classroom education at the primary campus in Little Rock, at which point a designated number of students volunteer or are selected to attend their final two years of clinical education at UAMS Northwest, with optional rotations in Little Rock and out of state their fourth year. The first medical students arrived at UAMS Northwest in 2009. The College of Pharmacy expanded enrollment in a similar arrangement and sent its first group of students in the fall of 2011. Enrollment in 2011 also expanded to include College of Nursing and College of Health Professions students in addition to the medical and pharmacy students.

In 2021 first year students in the college of medicine were offered the option to complete all 4 years on the Northwest Arkansas campus. As of 2023 there are students on the Northwest campus in their first, second, third, and fourth years.
