= UAMS Medical Center =

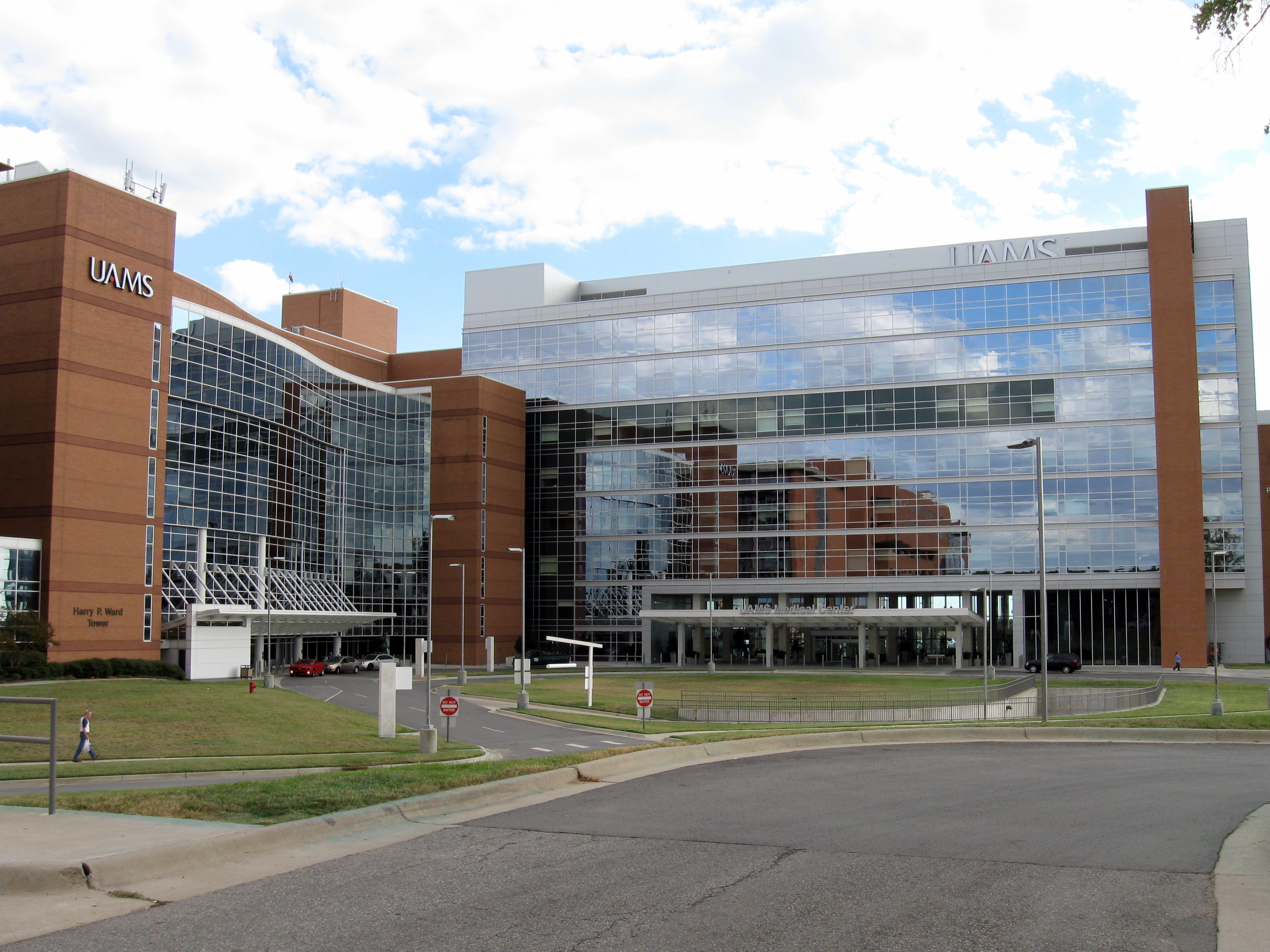
- Main Hospital Entrance at Hooper Drive

Geography
- Location: Little Rock, Arkansas, United States
- Coordinates: 34°44′53″N 92°19′15″W

Organization
- Type: Teaching
- Affiliated university: University of Arkansas for Medical Sciences

Services
- Standards: Joint Commission
- Emergency department: Level I trauma center
- Beds: 434

History
- Founded: 1892

Links
- Website: www.uamshealth.com
- Lists: Hospitals in Arkansas

UAMS Medical Center is a teaching hospital and a Level I trauma center in Little Rock, Arkansas.

== Overview ==
Formerly known as University Hospital of Arkansas, UAMS Medical Center is affiliated with UAMS College of Medicine, part of the University of Arkansas for Medical Sciences (UAMS) and under the flagship of the University of Arkansas System. UAMS Medical Center has been ranked as one of "America's Best Hospitals" by U.S. News & World Report 13 consecutive times. It is also recognized as a "high performing" hospital in the areas of Cancer, Ear, Nose and Throat, Gynecology, and Nephrology. UAMS Medical Center was featured on the cover of American Hospital Association's Health Facilities magazine for the recently constructed 553,282-square-foot (51,401.6 m^{2}), $197 million expansion to replace the original facility that was completed in 1956.

== Facilities ==
The UAMS campus facilities have undergone massive renovations and expansions in the past decades. The campus currently spans a total of 84 acres (340,000 m^{2}), covers over 25 buildings, and contains over 5,200,000 square feet (480,000 m^{2}).

== History ==
Although UAMS Medical Center (also known as University of Arkansas Medical Center) was founded in 1879, no patients were admitted or treated at the facility until 1892. What started as a free clinic later evolved into an entity known only as City Hospital when UAMS moved their campus just outside downtown Little Rock in 1935. That facility is now home to the William H. Bowen School of Law. UAMS and the City Hospital remained at that location until 1956, when they moved to the current location on West Markham Street in the central part of Little Rock. That 40-acre site was deeded to the university by the Arkansas State Hospital, and the name UAMS Medical Center originated with the new campus location. The campus saw extensive growth in the early 1960s to the late 1990s. UAMS began another large campus expansion in phases from 2001 to 2011, making it the state's largest academic health center.

== Affiliated institutions ==
- Arkansas Children's Hospital
- John L. McClellan Memorial Veterans Hospital-VA Medical Center (Central Arkansas Veterans Healthcare System)
