= Pat Walker (philanthropist) =

American philanthropist (1919–2016)

- Born: May 9, 1919; Boise, Idaho, U.S.
- Died: September 2, 2016 (aged 97)
- Known for: Philanthropy

Pat Walker (May 9, 1919 – September 2, 2016) was an American philanthropist and co-founder of the Walker Charitable Foundation. She is known for her charitable donations to the University of Arkansas and medical institutions such as Arkansas Children's Hospital. She was a lifetime board member for the Winthrop P. Rockefeller Cancer Institute, and a member of SpringCreek Fellowship of Springdale. In 2016, Walker was inducted into the Arkansas Women's Hall of Fame.

== Early life and career ==
Pat Walker was born in Boise, Idaho in 1919 before settling in Tulsa, Oklahoma. Her mother, Amy Seamans, worked three jobs to provide for her private schooling following a divorce from her father. When Pat Walker turned 21, she moved to Coffeyville, Kansas and worked as a sales clerk at a department store where she met her husband, Willard Walker. They married in 1942, and moved to Springdale, Arkansas where Willard managed one of the first Walmart stores.

== Willard and Pat Walker Charitable Foundation ==
Pat Walker and her husband, Willard Walker started the Willard and Pat Walker Charitable Foundation, in Springdale, Arkansas in 1986. They financed the charity using funds made from stock investments in Walmart and by 2010 had donated more than $125 million to other charities and organizations in Arkansas, Kansas, Missouri and Oklahoma. During her time as director of the charity, Pat Walker focused its resources on promoting healthcare and educational organizations. The University of Arkansas was a primary focus of the charity's giving, contributing $3 million towards the construction of a new health center named the Pat Walker Health Center which was completed in 2004. The Foundation also established numerous scholarship funds, the Pat Walker Endowed Scholarship Fund, the Pat Walker Honors College Fellowship and the Pat Walker Lady Razorback Endowed Scholarship in Gymnastics. Since 2001, Walker has donated $10 million to the University of the Ozarks, to build Walker Hall and finance educational programs for teachers and students. In memory of Pat and Willard Walker, the charity donated $3 million to Circle of Life Hospice helping in the construction of a new hospice in Bentonville, Arkansas.

== Organizations named after the Walkers ==
Walker's name is used, in her honor, with the following organizations: the Pat Walker Neonatal Intensive Care Unit (Arkansas Children’s Hospital), the Pat Walker Center for Children at the EOA Children’s House, Pat Walker Health Center (University of Arkansas), Pat Walker Center for Seniors (Washington Regional Medical Center), the Pat Walker Teacher Education Program (University of the Ozarks), Walker Elementary School (Springdale), and the Willard Walker Field House (Springdale High School).

== Awards ==
Walker was the recipient of the following awards: American Heart Association Tiffany Award, Distinguished Service Award from the Razorback Foundation, University of Arkansas for Medical Sciences Distinguished Service Award, Helen R. Walton Distinguished Achievement Award from the Walton Arts Center. She was inducted into Arkansas Women’s Hall of Fame, and into the Towers of Old Main in 2001 with husband Willard Walker. The Walkers were longtime members of the University of Arkansas Chancellor’s Society and the University of Arkansas for Medical Sciences Chancellor’s Society. Pat Walker was also an honorary chairwoman for Komen Ozark Race for the Cure.
