= Art Hobson =

American physicist

- Born: November 27, 1934 (age 91); Philadelphia, Pennsylvania, U.S.
- Awards: Fellow of the American Physical Society (1992); Robert A. Millikan Medal (2006)
- Scientific career
- Fields: Physics
- Workplaces: University of Arkansas
- Doctoral advisor: Boris Leaf

Art Hobson (born November 27, 1934) is an American physicist and professor emeritus of physics at the University of Arkansas. He has written on the foundations of quantum mechanics, physics education for non-science students, and the social implications of physics.

== Education and career ==
Hobson received a B.S. (1960) and a Ph.D. in theoretical physics (1964) from Kansas State University, where his advisor was Boris Leaf. He joined the University of Arkansas physics faculty in 1964, became full professor in 1974, and retired in 1999.

== Work ==
=== Quantum foundations ===
In a 2013 article in the American Journal of Physics, Hobson argued that quantum phenomena are better understood as excitations of quantum fields than as particles. Physicists Massimiliano Sassoli de Bianchi and Michel Nauenberg published comments on the paper, and Hobson responded. In 2018 he applied the same approach to the Schrödinger's cat problem.

=== Education and writing ===
Hobson developed "Physics and Human Affairs", a course for non-science majors, and wrote the textbook Physics: Concepts & Connections (first published 1995). His popular book Tales of the Quantum (Oxford University Press, 2017) was reviewed in the American Journal of Physics. He has also written a column for the Northwest Arkansas Democrat-Gazette.

== Awards ==
He was elected a Fellow of the American Physical Society in 1992 and received the American Association of Physics Teachers' Robert A. Millikan Medal in 2006.

== Selected books ==
- Physics and Human Affairs (Wiley, 1982)
- Physics: Concepts & Connections (Pearson, 1995)
- Tales of the Quantum: Understanding Physics' Most Fundamental Theory (Oxford University Press, 2017)
- Fields and Their Quanta: Making Sense of Quantum Foundations (Springer, 2024)
