= Anirban Basu =

Indian neurobiologist

- Born: India
- Education: Ballygunge Government High School Viswa Bharati University; Indian Institute of Chemical Biology; Penn State Milton S. Hershey Medical Center
- Known for: Studies on Japanese encephalitis
- Awards: 2010 N-BIOS Prize; 2011 VASVIK Industrial Research Award 2011 Dr. J. B. Srivastav Oration of the Indian Council of Medical Research; 2012 Rajib Goyal Prize; 2013 NASI-Reliance Industries Platinum Jubilee Award; 2015 Senior Scientist Oration Award of the Indian Immunology Society 2017 SBCI Sreenivasaya Memorial Award; 2018 Prof. S. S. Katiyar Endowment Lecture of the Indian Science Congress Association
- Scientific career
- Fields: Neurobiology; Neurovirology
- Workplaces: National Brain Research Centre

Anirban Basu is an Indian neurobiologist, who is primarily interested in neurovirology, a senior scientist at the National Brain Research Centre, a deemed to be university, located in Manesar, Gurgaon, Haryana. He is internationally known for his studies on Japanese encephalitis. Basu is an elected fellow of all the three major Indian science Academies namely the Indian Academy of Sciences, the Indian National Science Academy and the National Academy of Sciences, India as well as of the West Bengal Academy of Science and Technology. The Department of Biotechnology of the Government of India awarded him the National Bioscience Award for Career Development, one of the prominent Indian science awards, for his contributions to biosciences and biotechnology, in 2010.

== Biography ==
Vidyalaya Griha - Viswa Bharati University

Anirban Basu completed his undergraduate studies (BSc Hons) in 1991 and post graduate course (MSc) in 1993 at the School of Life Sciences of the Viswa Bharati University . His doctoral studies were at the CSIR-Indian Institute of Chemical Biology and later, he has done his postdoctoral studies at the Penn State Milton S. Hershey Medical Center, Hershey, Pennsylvania. Returning to India, he joined the National Brain Research Centre (NBRC) in 2004 as a scientist and a member of its faculty. At NBRC, presently he serves as a senior scientist and has established an independent laboratory to study different aspects of neurotropic viral infection of brain.

Basu resides inside the campus of National Brain Research Center, Manesar.

== Professional profile ==
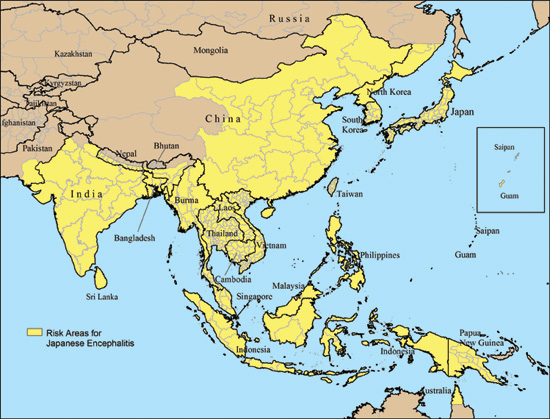
The geographic distribution of Japanese encephalitis (in yellow)

Basu's research focus is on central nervous system diseases (CNS diseases) and he has studied the central nervous system with regard to how microglia and neural stem/progenitor cells affect the system. The team led by him are involved in research on the pathogenesis of viruses such as Japanese encephalitis virus (JEV), West Nile Virus (WNV) and Chandipura virus (CHPV) and how they cause neuronal damage in hosts. In 2011, his group identified minocycline, a broad-spectrum tetracycline antibiotic generally used for treating skin infections, as having properties in fighting the disease of Japanese encephalitis, which they discovered through their experiments on mice. The findings were put on clinical trial at the King George's Medical University where it was found to have beneficial effect on Japanese encephalitis and Acute encephalitis syndrome patients who survive the initial attack of the diseases and this has led to a wider study on the subject. He was the guest editor for Clinical and Developmental Immunology journal when they released a special issue on Microglia in Development and Disease in 2013 and has mentored several research scholars in the post-graduate, doctoral and post-doctoral studies.

Basu serves as a member of the Faculty of 1000 at their division dealing with infectious diseases of the nervous system. He is also part of the editorial board of journals such as the Journal of Neurochemistry, Scientific Reports, Journal of Neuroinflammation, and Frontiers in Molecular Neuroscience

== Awards and honors ==
The Department of Biotechnology (DBT) of the Government of India awarded him the National Bioscience Award for Career Development, one of the prominent Indian science awards in 2010. The National Academy of Sciences, India elected him as a fellow in 2011 and he received the VASVIK Industrial Research Award the same year. He was chosen for the Rajib Goyal Prize of Kurukshetra University in 2012, the same year as he became an elected fellow of the West Bengal Academy of Science and Technology, and a year later, he received the NASI-Reliance Industries Platinum Jubilee Award. He was awarded the Sreenivasaya Memorial Award of Society of Biological Chemists (India) in 2017 and two of the other major Indian science academies, the Indian National Science Academy and the Indian Academy of Sciences elected him as their fellow in 2017 and 2018 respectively He held the Tata Innvovation fellowship of the Department of Biotechnology in 2015 and the award orations delivered by him included the 2011 edition of the Dr. J. B. Srivastav Oration of the Indian Council of Medical Research, the Senior Scientist Oration of the Indian Immunology Society in 2015 Prof. S. S. Katiyar Endowment Lecture of the Indian Science Congress Association in 2018. In 2019, he has been elected to Fellowship in the American Academy of Microbiology (AAM). The AAM is the honorific leadership group within the American Society for Microbiology (ASM), the world's oldest and largest life science organization.

== Selected bibliography ==
=== Books ===
- Nihar Jana; Anirban Basu; Prakash Narain Tandon (13 August 2016). Inflammation: the Common Link in Brain Pathologies. Springer. ISBN 978-981-10-1711-7.

=== Articles ===
- Hazra, Bibhabasu; Chakraborty, Surajit; Basu, Anirban (2017). "miR-301a mediated immune evasion by Japanese encephalitis virus". Oncotarget. 8 (53): 90620–90621. doi:10.18632/oncotarget.21674. PMC 5710865. PMID 29207584.
- Basu, Anirban; Dutta, Kallol (13 March 2017). "Recent advances in Japanese encephalitis". F1000Research. 6: 259. doi:10.12688/f1000research.9561.1. PMC 5357037. PMID 28357054.
- Hazra, Bibhabasu; Kumawat, Kanhaiya Lal; Basu, Anirban (14 February 2017). "The host microRNA miR-301a blocks the IRF1-mediated neuronal innate immune response to Japanese encephalitis virus infection". Sci. Signal. 10 (466) eaaf5185. doi:10.1126/scisignal.aaf5185. ISSN 1945-0877. PMID 28196914. S2CID 21351722.

== See also ==
- microRNA
- Japanese encephalitis vaccine
