= Sue T. Griffin =

American neuroscientist

Wilma Sue Tilton Griffin (born January 25, 1934) is an American neuroscientist best known for her contributions regarding the role of neuroinflammation in the pathogenesis of Alzheimer's disease and other neurodegenerative conditions. She conceived a "cytokine cycle" by which interleukin 1 and other paracrine factors conspire with one another to create a "feed-forward" cooperativity, thus establishing the premise for a progressive disease. Griffin is the Alexa and William T. Dillard Professor in Geriatric Research and director of research at the Donald W. Reynolds Institute on Aging at the University of Arkansas for Medical Sciences. She is also the founding chief editor of the Journal of Neuroinflammation.

== Early life ==
Griffin grew up in western Arkansas and attended high school in Fort Smith. After graduation, she moved with her parents to Los Alamos, New Mexico, where she worked for the Atomic Energy Commission and met and married her husband, Edmond Griffin. Ed was also a native Arkansan and worked at Los Alamos National Laboratory to help determine the biological effects of ionizing radiation. The couple had two sons, Edmond II and Clay.

== Scientific career ==
Sue Griffin received both a bachelor's and master's degree in nutrition from the University of Tennessee in Knoxville. In 1974, she earned a Ph.D. in physiology from the University of Rochester, School of Medicine. Following the completion of her doctorate, Griffin was a fellow at the University of Texas Southwestern Medical Center in Medicine. In 1986, Griffin moved to her home state of Arkansas to take a position in the Department of Pediatrics at the University of Arkansas for Medical Sciences, where her laboratory was physically located at Arkansas Children's Hospital. Although ostensibly committed to the pathogenesis of neurological aberrations in Down syndrome, her laboratory pursued the connections of this condition to Alzheimer's disease. In 1989, Griffin published a paper demonstrating the elevation of an immune system modulator, interleukin 1, in both Down Syndrome and Alzheimer's disease. This represents one of the first published connections between Alzheimer's disease and neuroinflammation. Griffin went on to show how this inflammation contributes to formation of amyloid plaques, neurofibrillary tangles, and Lewy bodies in Alzheimer and Parkinson disease brains, as well as its connections to genetic differences that confer greater risk of Alzheimer's disease in certain individuals.

In 2016, Griffin was awarded the lifetime achievement award from the Alzheimer's Association at its international conference. In 2018, she was inducted into the Arkansas Women's Hall of Fame.
