= Sam Gandy =

- Education: B.S., Charleston Southern University (Chemistry) M.D., Ph.D., Medical University of South Carolina (Molecular Cell Biology) Columbia University College of Physicians and Surgeons Cornell University Medical College The Rockefeller University; Nathan S. Kline Institute for Psychiatric Research
- Years active: 1986-present
- Medical career
- Profession: Physician, Scientist
- Institutions: Mount Sinai South Australia Health and Medical Research Institute Rockefeller University; New York Hospital Cornell Medical Center
- Research: Amyloid impact in Alzheimer’s disease, neurology, cell biology

Samuel E. Gandy, is a neurologist, cell biologist, Alzheimer's disease (AD) researcher and expert in the metabolism of the sticky substance called amyloid that clogs the brain in patients with Alzheimer's. His team discovered the first drugs that could lower the formation of amyloid.

As of 2020, he is Mount Sinai Professor of Alzheimer's Disease Research, professor of neurology and psychiatry, Icahn School of Medicine at Mount Sinai, director, Center for Cognitive Health and NFL Neurological Center Mount Sinai Hospital, visiting principal research fellow, South Australia Health and Medical Research Institute in Adelaide, SA, Australia, and chairman emeritus of the National Medical and Scientific Advisory Council of the Alzheimer's Association. He was also founding director, Farber Institute for the Neurosciences.

== Research ==
Gandy has written more than 250 peer-reviewed papers, chapters and reviews on this topic. He has received continuous National Institutes of Health (NIH) funding for his research on amyloid metabolism since 1986. He holds four patents that can be implemented to regulate key proteins, inhibiting Alzheimer-type amyloidosis and a diagnostic method for Alzheimer disease, Huntington's disease, Parkinson's disease, dystonia ataxia, schizophrenia, epilepsy, brain tumors, brain irradiation, head trauma, and acute and chronic encephalitic and vascular disease. Gandy also studies brain imaging as a tool to confirm chronic traumatic encephalopathy (CTE) in retired athletes and war Veterans during their lifetimes.

=== Patents ===
- Use of phosphoprotein patterns for diagnosis of neurological and psychiatric disorders, (1989).
- Treatment of amyloidosis associated with Alzheimer disease, (1993).
- Method of screening for modulators of amyloid formation, (1994).
- Treatment of amyloidosis associated with Alzheimer disease using modulators of protein phosphorylation, (1995).

=== Grants ===
Gandy worked on 36 research grants, 18 as principal investigator, since 1986. As of 2020, he works on nine active grants.

Partial list of active grants in 2020:

Funding Source, & Number	Project Title	Description
NIH-NIA to NYSCF, R01 AG061894	Use of iPSC systems to define roles of microglial TREM2/DAP12 and CR3/DAP12 complexes and their genetic variants in specifying risk for late-onset sporadic Alzheimer’s disease.	Develop a system based on mixing various individual iPSC-derived brain cell types or on the cultivation of organoids where all the cell types are naturally represented.
NIH-NIA, U01 AG046170	Integrative Network Biology Approaches to Identify, Characterize and Validate Molecular Subtypes in AD.	Identify and characterize molecular subtypes of AD with state-of-the-art network biology approaches to all existing large-scale genetic, gene expression, proteomic and functional MRI data
NIH-NIA, R01AG058469	Integrated understanding of complex viral network biology in Alzheimer’s Disease	Develop and experimentally evaluate novel molecular models of microbial perturbation in AD.
NIH-NIA, RF1AG059319	Systematic Drug Repurposing Targeting Immune Activation Networks in Alzheimer’s Disease	To leverage recent insights from genetic studies and drug repurposing to identify established therapies that could be repurposed to meet the great unmet need for new and effective treatments targeting immune dysfunction in AD.
NIH, R01AG057907	Integrative Network Modeling of Cognitive Resilience to Alzheimer’s Disease	Systematically develop and validate molecular network models underlying cognitive resilience to AD risk.

== Editorialships and boards ==
As of 2020, Gandy is on the editorial boards of Neurodegenerative Diseases, Journal of Neuroinflammation and The Journal of Biological Chemistry. He is an associate editor at Alzheimer’s Disease and Associated Disorders and Journal of Neuroinflammation.

== Publications ==
Gandy has an h-index of 83 in 2020; a partial list of peer-reviewed publications include:

- Gandy, Sam; DeKosky, Steven T. (29 September 2014). "[18F]-T807 tauopathy PET imaging in chronic traumatic encephalopathy". F1000Research. 3: 229. doi:10.12688/f1000research.5372.1. PMC 4240239. PMID 25469232.
- Wilde, Elisabeth A.; Bouix, Sylvain; Tate, David F.; Lin, Alexander P.; Newsome, Mary R.; Taylor, Brian A.; Stone, James R.; Montier, James; Gandy, Samuel E.; Biekman, Brian; Shenton, Martha E.; York, Gerald (8 September 2015). "Advanced neuroimaging applied to veterans and service personnel with traumatic brain injury: state of the art and potential benefits". Brain Imaging and Behavior. 9 (3): 367–402. doi:10.1007/s11682-015-9444-y. PMC 6547383. PMID 26350144.
- Gandy, Sam; Sano, Mary (3 November 2015). "Solanezumab—prospects for meaningful interventions in AD?". Nature Reviews Neurology. 11 (12): 669–670. doi:10.1038/nrneurol.2015.218. PMC 5959015. PMID 26526537.
- Hunsberger, Joshua G; Rao, Mahendra; Kurtzberg, Joanne; Bulte, Jeff W M; Atala, Anthony; LaFerla, Frank M; Greely, Henry T; Sawa, Akira; Gandy, Sam; Schneider, Lon S; Doraiswamy, P Murali (February 2016). "Accelerating stem cell trials for Alzheimer's disease". The Lancet Neurology. 15 (2): 219–230. doi:10.1016/S1474-4422(15)00332-4. PMID 26704439. S2CID 5507852.
- Stoeckel, Luke E.; Arvanitakis, Zoe; Gandy, Sam; Small, Dana; Kahn, C. Ronald; Pascual-Leone, Alvaro; Pawlyk, Aaron; Sherwin, Robert; Smith, Philip (2 June 2016). "Complex mechanisms linking neurocognitive dysfunction to insulin resistance and other metabolic dysfunction". F1000Research. 5: 353. doi:10.12688/f1000research.8300.2. PMC 4897751. PMID 27303627.
- Sano, Mary; Gandy, Sam (12 April 2016). "Sex differences in cognition". Neurology. 86 (15): 1364–1365. doi:10.1212/WNL.0000000000002573. PMID 26984948. S2CID 3021875.
- Martins, Ralph N.; Gandy, Sam (23 February 2016). "Increased dementia risk following androgen deprivation therapy?". Nature Reviews Urology. 13 (4): 188–189. doi:10.1038/nrurol.2016.34. PMID 26902342. S2CID 33888037.
- Pullman, M Y; Dickstein, D L; DeKosky, S T; Gandy, S (10 January 2017). "Antemortem biomarker support for a diagnosis of clinically probable chronic traumatic encephalopathy". Molecular Psychiatry. 22 (5): 638–639. doi:10.1038/mp.2016.236. PMC 5415635. PMID 28070125.
- Gandy, Sam; Bartfai, Tamas; Lees, Graham V.; Sano, Mary (3 April 2017). "Midlife interventions are critical in prevention, delay, or improvement of Alzheimer's disease and vascular cognitive impairment and dementia". F1000Research. 6: 413. doi:10.12688/f1000research.11140.1. PMC 5399952. PMID 28491285.

== Biography ==
Gandy received his MD and PhD at the Medical University of South Carolina.

He did his postgraduate work at the Columbia University College of Physicians & Surgeons and Cornell University Medical College. Gandy completed his post-doctorate at Rockefeller University, where he was appointed assistant professor in the laboratory of Paul Greengard, 2000 Laureate of the Nobel Prize in Physiology or Medicine.

Gandy was appointed associate professor of neurology and neurosciences at Cornell University Medical College in 1992. In 1997, he moved to New York University where he served as professor of psychiatry and cell biology until his appointment as Paul C. Brucker, M.D., Professor of Neuroscience at Jefferson Medical College and Director of the Farber Institute for Neurosciences in 2001. In July 2007, he assumed his current post as Sinai Professor of Alzheimer’s Disease Research at the Mount Sinai School of Medicine. He is also a member of the Research Consortium of the Cure Alzheimer's Fund.

In 2009, Gandy was featured with other prominent research scientists as one of GQ's "Rockstars of Science" and featured in the documentary film I Remember Better When I Paint that examines the phenomenon of how the creative arts awaken pathways to emotional parts of the brain.
