= Arkansas Women's Hall of Fame =

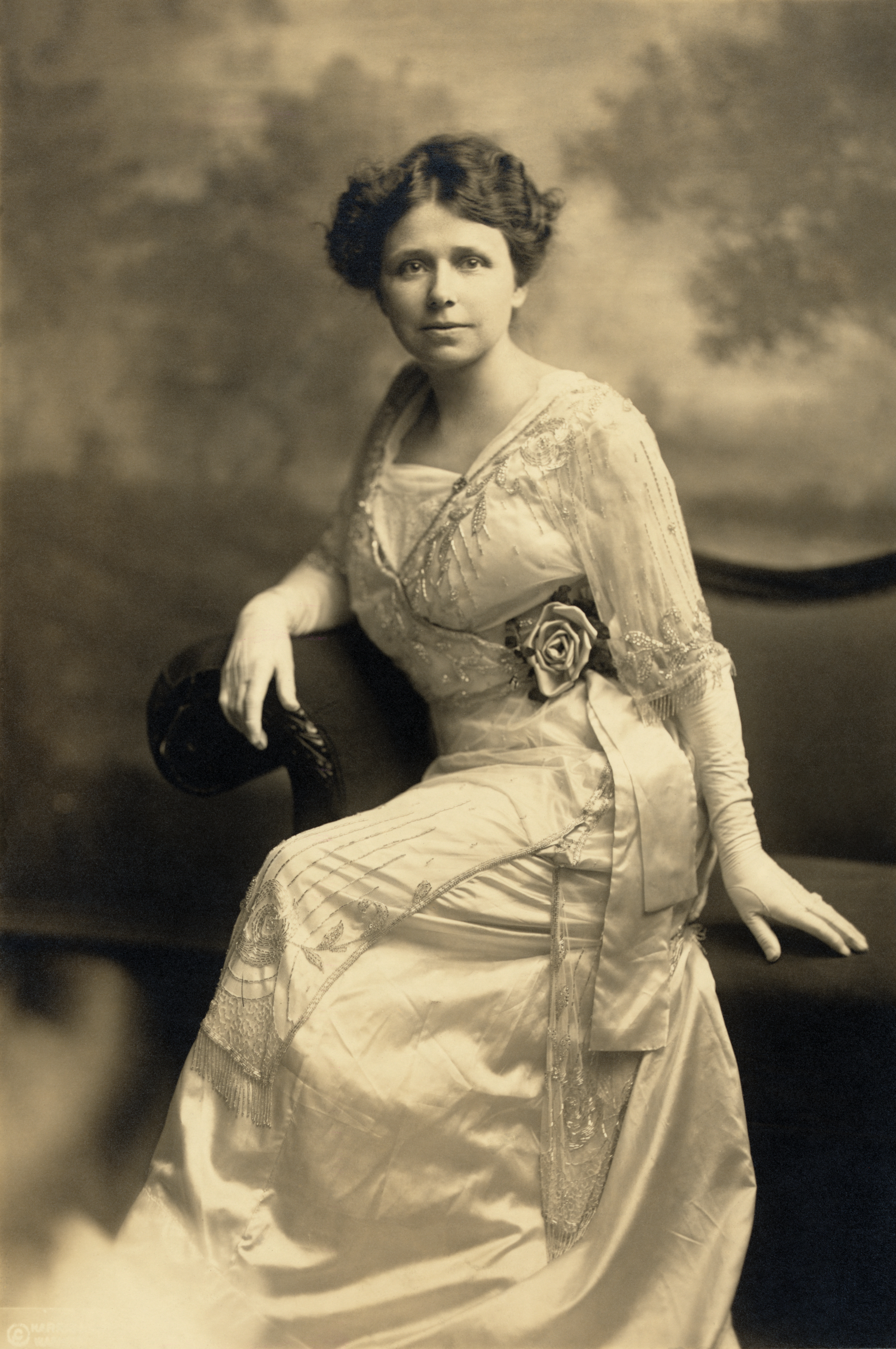
Hattie Caraway, first woman elected as a United States senator

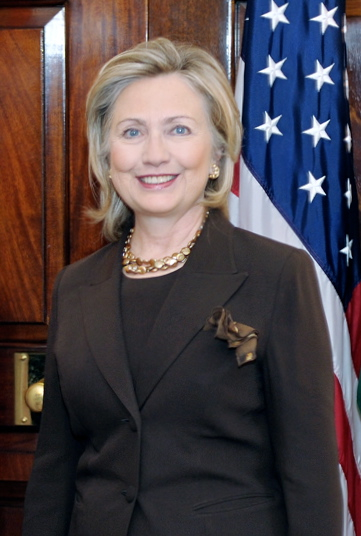
Hillary Clinton Secretary of State, 2010

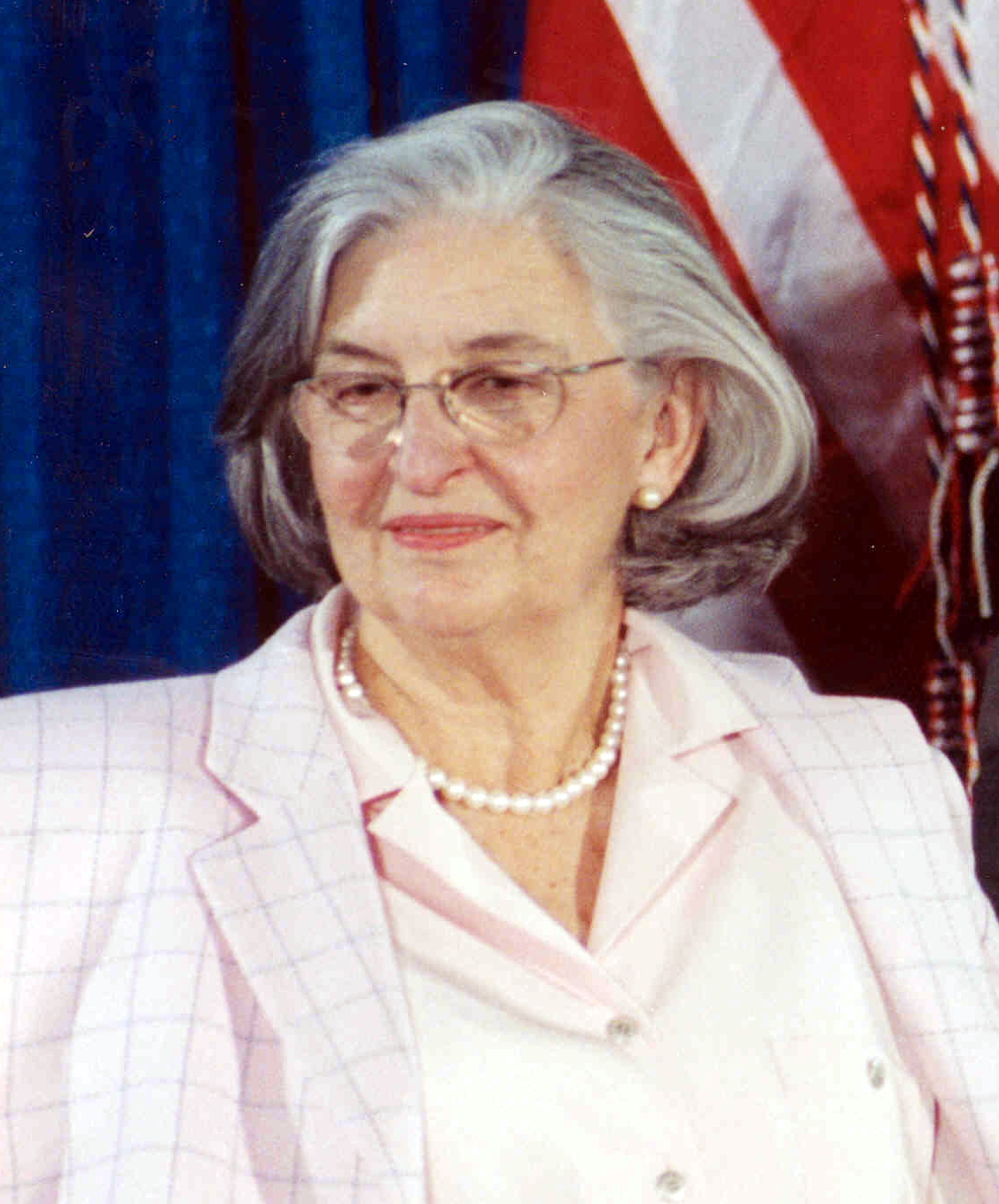
Betty Bumpers, Arkansas first lady, 1999

The Arkansas Women's Hall of Fame is a non-profit, volunteer organization that recognizes women who have contributed to history of the U.S. state of Arkansas.

== History ==
The organization was founded and incorporated as a non-profit organization in 2014 to recognize women's contributions and impact upon the state of Arkansas. It was formed as a partnership between the Arkansas Business Publishing Group and the North Little Rock Chamber of Commerce. An eleven-member board was developed to create a permanent location for the Hall of Fame and a sustained tribute to the women who have helped to build the state. Until a permanent facility is built, the plans call for a statewide traveling exhibit on the inductees. The inaugural group of women, inducted on 27 August 2015, included 11 women and one organization, the Women's Emergency Committee to Open Our Schools and were selected from public nominations of 73 potential candidates.

== Criteria ==
The criteria for induction into the Arkansas Women's Hall of Fame is that women were born in and achieved recognition within the state; are or have been a resident in Arkansas for an extended period of time and achieved prominence within the state; or were born in or lived in Arkansas for a significant period of time and achieved prominence elsewhere. Additional criteria:

- Made significant and enduring contributions to their field, whether professional or not;
- Made improvements to the cultural, economic, political or social status of their community, the state or the nation;
- Elevated the status of women and/or girls;
- Helped open new frontiers for women and the general society;
- Were inspirational role models.

== Inductees ==
The hall inducts new members annually and includes both contemporary and historical women or organizations which benefit women.

Arkansas Women's Hall of Fame
Name	Image	Birth–Death	Year	Area of achievement	Ref(s)
Bernie Babcock		(1868–1962)	2024	Author	
Betty Dickey		(1940–)	2024	Chief justice of the Arkansas Supreme Court	
Gussie Haynie		(1901–1957)	2024	Lawyer	
Jacquelyn Williams McCray			2024	Professor and academic administrator	
Jamileh Kamran			2024	Fashion designer	
JoAnne Bush			2024	Public servant	
Kathy Webb		(1949–)	2024	Restaurateur and politician; Current Vice-Mayor of Little Rock	
Committee of One Hundred for the Ozark Folk Center			2024		
Sandra Keiser Edwards			2023	Crystal Bridges Museum of American Art	
Cathy Hastings Owen			2023	Chairman of Eagle Bank & Trust Company, as well as Chairman, President & CEO of State Holding Company, in Little Rock	
Pat Steele Qualls			2023	Lake City Mayor, President Clinton appointee to Arkansas Public Service Commission (APSC)	
Nan Snow		(1936–)	2023	Civic activist for women's issues; a founder and charter member of the UCA Women's Giving Circle	
Joyce Williams Warren		(1949–)	2023	Arkansas' first black female judge, and multiple other firsts for black women	
Dorothy McFadden Hoover		(1918–2000)	2023	American physicist and mathematician	
Adolphine Fletcher Terry		(1882–1976)	2023	Political and social activist	
Women's Giving Circle			2023	University of Arkansas alumni, financial support for university projects	
Margaret Louise Sirman Clark			2020	First woman African-American professor hired by the University of Arkansas	
Cynthia L. Conger			2020	Financial planner	
Hispanic Women's Organization of Arkansas			2020		
Brownie Ledbetter		(1932–2010)	2020	Political activism	
Dorothy Morris			2020	Philanthropist	
Carolyn Pollan		(1937–2021)	2020	Arkansas State Representative	
Amy Rossi			2020	Executive director of Arkansas Advocates for Children and Families	
Sister Rosetta Tharpe		(1915–1973)	2020	Entertainer	
Alice Andrews			2019	Conservationist	
Alpha Kappa Alpha sorority Beta Pi Omega chapter			2019		
Diane Frances Divers Kincaid Blair		(1938–2000)	2019	Educator, political advisor, and writer	
Olivia Farrell			2019	Publisher; co-founder of the Arkansas Women's Foundation	
Jo Luck			2019	Activist for ending world hunger	
Charlotte Tillar Schexnayder		(1923–2020)	2019	Arkansas House of Representatives; first female president of the National Newspaper Association	
Louise McPhetridge Thaden		(1935–2018)	2019	Aviation pioneer	
Carolyn Witherspoon			2019	Founding partner of Cross, Gunter, Witherspoon and Galchus law firm; first woman to serve as president of the Arkansas Bar Association	
Caroline F. Blakely			2018	Chancellor emeritus at the University of Arkansas at Pine Bluff	
Karen Flake			2018	President and CEO of Mount St. Mary Academy, Little Rock	
Sue Griffin		(1934–)	2018	Editor in Chief Journal of Neuroinflamattion	
Raye Montague		(1935–2018)	2018	US Navy engineer and graphics designer	
Bessie Boehm Moore		(1935–2018)	2018	Educator, civic leader, helped create the first public library in Pine Bluff.	
Florence Beatrice Smith Price		(1887–1953)	2018	Musical composer	
Mary Steenburgen		(1953–)	2018	Actress	
Annabelle Davis Clinton Imber Tuck		(1950–)	2018	First woman elected to the Arkansas Supreme Court	
Women's Foundation of Arkansas			2018	The only foundation in the state focusing solely on women and girls	
Maya Angelou		(1928–2004)	2017	Poet	
June B. Freeman			2017	Architect	
Ruth Hawkins			2017	Historic preservation	
Brinda J. Jackson			2017	Architect	
Bernice Young Jones		(1905–2003)	2017	Philanthropist	
Pat Lile			2017	President and CEO of the Arkansas Community Foundation, Inc.	
Olivetan Benedictine Sisters			2017	Established St. Bernards Hospital and Regional Medical Center	
Elsijane Trimble Roy		(1916–2007)	2017	Associate Justice of the Arkansas Supreme Court and a United States federal judge	
Joanna Seibert			2017	Pediatric Radiology	
Dorothy Stuck		(1921–2021)	2017	Civil rights	
Kay Kelley Arnold			2016	Community activist	
Bettye Caldwell		(1924–2016)	2016	Educator and academic	
Cathy Cunningham			2016	Community development advocate	
Joycelyn Elders		(1933–)	2016	Former Surgeon General of the United States	
Betty Ann Lowe		(1934–2013)	2016	Pediatrician and educator	
Religious Sisters of Mercy of the Americas			2016		
Lottie Shackelford		(1941–)	2016	Mayor of Little Rock	
Patti Upton		(1938–2017)	2016	Founder and former CEO of decorative fragrance company Aromatique	
Pat Walker		(1919–2016)	2016	Philanthropist	
Mary Ann Ritter Arnold		(1927–2017)	2015	First female mayor of Marked Tree, Arkansas, President of agribusiness and communications firm E. Ritter & Co	
Daisy Bates		(1914–1999)	2015	American civil rights activist, Little Rock Integration Crisis planner	
Betty Bumpers		(1925–2018)	2015	Former Arkansas First Lady who led a statewide childhood immunization program	
Hattie Caraway		(1878–1950)	2015	First woman elected to serve in the United States Senate	
Hillary Clinton		(1947–)	2015	Former Arkansas First Lady, First Lady of the United States, U.S. senator from New York, and U.S. Secretary of State	
Hester Davis		(1930–2014)	2015	State Archaeologist with the Arkansas Archaeological Survey	
Roberta Fulbright		(1874–1953)	2015	Newspaper publisher and women's rights advocate; mother of United States Senator J. William Fulbright	
Mary Good		(1931–2019)	2015	Founding Dean of the College of Engineering and Information Technology (E.I.T.) at the University of Arkansas Little Rock	
Johnelle Hunt		(1932–)	2015	Co-founder and former Board Member of J.B. Hunt Transport Services, Inc.	
Edith Jones		(1927–2019)	2015	First African American to attend and to graduate from the University of Arkansas Medical School, first female president of the National Medical Association	
Alice Walton		(1949–)	2015	WalMart heiress and founder of Crystal Bridges Museum of American Art	
Women's Emergency Committee to Open Our Schools			2015	Advocated integration of the Little Rock public school system	
