= Ozarks Community Hospital =

Geography
- Location: Gravette, Arkansas, United States
- Coordinates: 36.408908°N 94.460578°W

Organization
- Type: General

Services
- Beds: 25

Links
- Lists: Hospitals in Arkansas

The Ozarks Community Hospital is a healthcare provider headquartered in Gravette, Arkansas, serving both urban and rural communities throughout the Ozarks. Facilities include a hospital located in Gravette, Arkansas and a number of satellite clinics located in Southwest Missouri, Northwest Arkansas and Northeast Oklahoma.

The hospital offers a 25-bed inpatient and swing bed (skilled nursing) service, a 24-hour ER, and a number of other services, including:

- Outpatient (Infusions/Transfusions, Geriatric Psych, Wound Care, Restorative Therapies)
- Surgery (Endoscopy, General, ENT, Orthopedic, Dental, Podiatry (strike), Plastics)
- Mental Health (Inpatient and Outpatient)
- Therapy (PT, OT, Speech)
- Cardiopulmonary and Sleep Lab
- Diagnostic Imaging (MRI, CT, Ultrasound, X-ray)
- Comprehensive Hospital & Reference Laboratory

== Facilities ==
The OCH health provides Medical Homes through a dozen rural health clinics and as part of a broader range of specialty services located in its two clinics in Gravette, Arkansas and Springfield, Missouri. Specialty clinic services include Pediatrics, Women's Health, Diabetes Care, Hepatitis C, Urology, Geriatrics, Pain Management, and the FLAG (Fatty Liver and Goals) Clinic.
