= Bessie Boehm Moore =

American librarian (1902–1995)

- Moore c. 1980
- Born: August 2, 1902; Owensboro, Kentucky, U.S.
- Died: October 24, 1995 (aged 93)
- Education: Arkansas State Teachers College (BA)
- Occupations: Educator, librarian

Bessie Grace Boehm Moore (August 2, 1902 – October 24, 1995) was an American educator from Arkansas. She was a lifelong advocate to increase funding and support for libraries and served on the Arkansas Library Commission for 38 years. In 1999, American Libraries named her one of the "100 Most Important Leaders We Had in the 20th Century".

== Biography ==
=== Early life and education ===
Bessie Boehm Moore was born August 2, 1902, in Owensboro, Kentucky, but grew up near Mountain View, Arkansas. Her 17-year-old mother died shortly after the birth, and her father, Edgar Boehm, took her to an aunt's house where she was raised. At age 14, she earned a teaching certificate and began teaching at the public school in the village of St. James, Arkansas. Arriving in St. James on the eve of World War I, she found a sign scrawled on the schoolhouse door "We ant agonna have no German teachers here." As irrelevant as it was, the threat unsettled her, but she pulled down the sign and started to work. She earned a BA in education from the Arkansas State Teachers College in 1942.

=== Career ===
She gained respect in the educational community and although she held no office as of this time officials invited her to their councils and invited her to speak. At the early age of 24, she was on the National Committee for the Sesquicentennial Celebration of the United States. In 1934, she was appointed as Supervisor of Nursery Schools, then appointed as the Supervisor for Elementary Education of Arkansas in 1939 until 1944.

She was president of the American Library Trustee Association (ALTA) from 1957 to 1959.

"The Arkansas State Council on Economic Education formed in 1962 with Moore as the Executive Director from 1962 to 1979."

In 1963, Moore was chosen to chair the Ozark Folk Center Commission in Mountain View, Arkansas. The center was the only one of its kind.

In 1966 President Lyndon B. Johnson appointed Moore to the National Advisory Commission on Libraries

From 1972 to 1988 she was a member of the National Commission on Libraries and Information Science appointed by three consecutive presidents, Richard Nixon, Jimmy Carter, and Ronald Reagan. On the council she served as vice Chairman Emeritus.

While many of her accomplishments were focused in her home state of Arkansas, she was an annual lecturer at many out of state universities from 1974. This list included the University of Michigan, University of Nebraska–Lincoln, Florida State University, University of Arizona, and the University of South Florida. She holds a special place as one of the five honorary members of the University of Michigan Library School Alumni Association.

She was awarded American Library Association Honorary Membership in 1980.

Moore had three roles throughout her career not having to do with education or libraries: as one of the first County Supervisors for Jefferson County, Arkansas, her joint ownership of a local cafeteria with her husband until his death in 1958, and serving on the board of directors of the First National Bank of Little Rock from 1971 until 1979.

=== Death and afterward ===
Bessie Boehm Moore died on October 24, 1995.

Several organizations and awards are named in her honor:

- The Bessie B. Moore Center for Economic Education, established in 1978 at the University of Arkansas, gives the Bessie Moore Award annually to an outstanding economic educator in the US.
- Moore established the Bessie Boehm Moore-Thorndike Press Award in 1991, sponsored by the American Library Association, giving a $1000 scholarship to the recipient. 1996 was the only year that her scholarship was not awarded. It was resumed in 2000.
- The Mountain View Public Library in Mountain View, Arkansas, was renamed the Bessie B. Moore Public Library in her honor on August 1, 1992.

== Awards ==
- 1952: Arkansas Woman of the Year
- 1958: Honorary Doctor of Laws, University of Arkansas
- 1959: C.E. Palmer Distinguished Service Award (Moore remains the only woman to have ever received that award)
- 1977: Honorary Doctor of Laws, University of Arizona.
- 1980 American Library Association Honorary Membership.
- 1989: Distinguished Lifetime Service Award, NCLIS.
- National Distinguished Award, Joint Council of Economic Education of New York
- 2018: Arkansas Women's Hall of Fame
