= Roberta Fulbright =

American businesswoman (1874–1953)

- Born: Roberta Waugh; February 14, 1874; Rothville, Missouri
- Died: January 11, 1953 (aged 78); Fayetteville, Arkansas
- Other name: Roberta Waugh Fulbright
- Occupations: journalist, newspaper editor, businesswoman
- Years active: 1923–1952

Roberta Fulbright (February 14, 1874 – January 11, 1953) was an American businesswoman who consolidated her husband's business enterprises and became an influential newspaper publisher, editor, and journalist. She used her paper to push civic responsibility and women's rights. Fulbright was the 1946 Arkansas Mother of the Year, a co-founder of the Arkansas Newspaper Women (now known as the Arkansas Press Women), and was posthumously inducted into the Arkansas Women's Hall of Fame in its inaugural group of honorees.

== Early and personal life ==
Roberta Waugh was born on February 14, 1874, in Rothville, Missouri to Pattie (née Stratton) and James Gilliam Waugh. She grew up on her family's farm in Rothville and attended school, church services at the Missionary Baptist Church, and learned to play the piano and organ. When she was sixteen, she passed the examination of Chariton County and obtained her first teaching position. Her parents sent her away to attend high school in Kansas City and then to a two-year college program at the University of Missouri to allow her to be fully certified as a teacher. Waugh took advantage of her college experience and excelled in studies which interested her like English and history. She joined the Kappa Kappa Gamma sorority, participating in a variety of social and intellectual events, including attending a lecture by Walter Williams, founder of Missouri's school of journalism. The lecture inspired a lifelong interest in journalism, but she returned to Rothville to become a teacher.

On 30 October 1894, she married Jay Fulbright, a local man whose parents were also farmers in the community. The couple began their life on a farm and started their family. Within a few years, they had accumulated enough money to purchase a bank in Sumner, a nearby town, and relocated there. Fulbright had four children over the next few years—Frances Lucile, Anna, Jay Jr., and James William—yet found time between raising the children to help at the bank. In 1906, the family moved to Fayetteville, Arkansas and Jay became involved in several business ventures including becoming president of the Arkansas National Bank. Jay's business strategy was to locate businesses that were struggling, buy them, get them back on solid footing and then resell them to recoup his investment for a profit. In this way, he became a stockholder in Arkansas National, as well as Citizens Bank in Fayetteville, and an investor in other banks in nearby towns. He purchased timber interests, real estate, groceries, a poultry plant, an ice company, lumber company, a hotel, and a publishing house, among others. During these years, Roberta was involved in her family and civic and social clubs and in 1911 gave birth to their last two children, twin girls, Roberta and Helen. The family thrived, their business grew, they contributed to the development of their community and then in a sudden illness lasting just 56 hours, Jay died on July 23, 1923.

== Career ==
Jay died intestate and his various business partners took action to protect their own interests. Competitors, sensing she was vulnerable, and even partners began filing legal claims and demanding prompt payments. Fulbright was appointed to fill Jay's unexpired term as a director at Arkansas National Bank, becoming the first woman bank director in Fayetteville. Fulbright, however, traded her bank shares for a controlling interest in the Washington Hotel. The hotel was the largest establishment of its kind in north-west Arkansas. It was also landlord to the bank and within six months, Fulbright was able to evict the bank. The lawsuits against her husband's former estate also included those by Josephine Waugh, her brother Tom's widow, who filed suit to protect her interest in the Coca-Cola Bottling franchise and ice business. The business was placed on the auction block and Fulbright was able to secure the highest bid. Within a relatively short period of time, Fulbright was able to consolidate some assets, liquidate others and stabilize the business holdings of the Fulbright Investment Company, dashing the ideas that she would not be able to run the businesses. In the midst of her business difficulties, Fulbright took a course in 1925 in English composition and then focused on her newspaper business, Fayetteville Daily Democrat, to consolidate her influence. By 1926, she secured full interest in the newspaper.

In 1933, Fulbright began writing a column in the Democrat called "As I See It". The column was an editorial covering an eclectic mix of topics from women's equality to war to gardening to politics, tourism, philosophy, and many others. It is estimated that in her twenty-year career, she wrote around 2 million words. In the mid-1930s Fulbright decided to take on political corruption, calling for an audit of the county's books and writing about a stolen car ring involving local officials. She was concerned about the judiciary that sheltered the bootlegging, corruption, fraud and graft, but also was angry that county contracts only went to cronies or those willing to pay for protection. Her exposure of the corruption and a sheriff who pleaded guilty to conspiracy in federal court increased Fulbright's regional reputation and a candidate she endorsed won election in 1936. In 1937, the newspaper was renamed The Northwest Arkansas Times to reflect its goals for broader reach.

In 1939, Fulbright's son Bill was appointed by Governor Carl E. Bailey, a candidate Fulbright had endorsed, as president of the University of Arkansas. In 1940, Bailey was bested in the governor's race by long-time rival Homer Adkins, who replaced Bill as university president in 1941. The following year, Bill won a seat in the U.S. House of Representatives and in 1944, beat Adkins in a bid for the Democratic nomination for the United States Senate.

In 1946, Fulbright was named by the Golden Rule Foundation as Arkansas Mother of the Year. In 1949, Fulbright established a scholarship fund for the journalism school at the University of Arkansas and published a book of poetry which she gave as Christmas gifts. That same year, she helped found the Arkansas Newspaper Women and the following year was named as its honorary lifetime president. In 1952, she published a collection of her "As I See It" columns.

Fulbright died on January 11, 1953, aged 78, in Fayetteville. Posthumously, the University of Arkansas established a memorial bookshelf in her honor and in 1959 named a women's residence hall in her honor. In 1961, a new public library was built bearing her name and the dining hall of the Northwest Quad residence halls at the University of Arkansas was renamed in her honor in 2012. She was one of the inaugural women inducted into the Arkansas Women's Hall of Fame in 2015.

== Selected works ==
- Fulbright, Roberta Waugh (1949). Read, Lessie Stringfellow (ed.). Sea (see) foam: travel notes. Siloam Springs, Arkansas: John Brown University Press. OCLC 10580296.
- Fulbright, Roberta (1952). As I see it. Fayetteville, Arkansas: Northwest Arkansas Times. OCLC 6622076.
