= Jerome K. Sherman =

Founder of sperm banking and cryopreservation (1925–2023)

- Born: August 14, 1925; Brooklyn, New York, U.S.
- Died: December 1, 2023 (aged 98); Arkansas, U.S.
- Education: Brown University; Case Western University; University of Iowa
- Scientific career
- Workplaces: University of Arkansas
- Thesis: Freezing and freeze-drying of human spermatozoa (1954)
- Doctoral advisor: H.W. Beams

Jerome Kalman Sherman (August 14, 1925 – December 1, 2023) was an American biologist and credited as a founder of modern sperm banking and cryopreservation. Sherman was also a professor of biology at University of Arkansas for more than three decades.

== Early life and military service ==
Jerome Kalman Sherman was born in 1925 in Brooklyn, New York, to Murray and Beatrice Sherman, a sailmaker and Navy Yard worker. After graduating from Erasmus Hall High School early, he enrolled at Brooklyn College at the age of 16, but after three semesters put his studies on hold to enlist in the military during World War II.

At age 17, in 1943, Sherman joined the U.S. Navy as a seaman and earned a commission at Notre Dame. He then served in the Pacific Theater as an anti-submarine officer until 1945, learning of the Japanese surrender on his 20th birthday. Subsequently he served in occupied Japan as part of the first naval line officer to enter Nagasaki, left the Navy as a lieutenant commander.

== Education ==
Sherman received his bachelor's degree in biology in 1947 from Brown University. In 1949 he received a master's degree in biology from Western Reserve University (now Case Western University). He completed his graduate studies at the University of Iowa, where he earned a doctorate in zoology in 1954.

Sherman's doctoral thesis and research activity initially focused on electron microscopy, and later freezing kidney tissue; but he ultimately changed his subject to freezing and freeze-drying human semen after a series of successful trials in the university's urology department and fertility clinic.

== Career and research ==
While a graduate student at the University of Iowa, Sherman also worked in the campus library and as a janitor in addition to his research assistant duties.

In 1953, while working as a research associate in the university's Department of Urology, Sherman refined a process that had been developed in 1949 by A.S. Parkes and two British scientists, which involved the use of glycerol to preserve animal sperm during freezing and thawing. Combined with the glycerol method, Sherman introduced slow cooling and use of solid carbon dioxide as a refrigerant during storage. Sherman collaborated on these experiments with urologist Dr. Raymond Bunge, who arranged for Sherman to be hired in the urology department and who was affiliated with the university's new fertility clinic, which had opened in early 1952. Bunge and Sherman had met while Sherman was painting the former's house in another side job.

In 1953, three patients at the clinic were impregnated using frozen sperm, with Dr. William Keettel, an obstetrician at the fertility clinic, overseeing the patients. The same year, Sherman established the first sperm cryobank in the world in Iowa City to assist these pregnancies. Bunge and Sherman published their findings first in the Proceedings of the Society for Experimental Biology and Medicine and later Nature magazine. The babies from this initial experiment were born in 1954, and the milestone was first publicized in the Cedar Rapids Gazette under the headline "Fatherhood After Death Has Now Been Proved Possible."

After receiving his doctorate, Sherman accepted a position at the Biological Research Institute with the American Foundation for Biological Research in Madison, Wisconsin, in 1954. In 1957 Sherman joined the faculty at the University of Arkansas. He served as a professor there until 1992, when he became a professor emeritus and continued work until 1994. At University of Arkansas for Medical Sciences, he founded what is considered to be the second human semen cryobank. During his career, he also traveled by request to assist with the establishment of other cryobanks across the country. He also helped to establish and advocate for the Office of Minority Affairs within the School of Medical Sciences at Arkansas.

From 1974 to 1975, he spent a year on sabbatical teaching at National Chung-Hsing University in Taichung, Taiwan. Throughout his career, Sherman was also active in professional societies including his role as a charter member of the Society of Cryobiology in 1964, where he also served on the society's editorial board; as a founder of the American Association of Tissue Banks, where he drafted the first standards for the cryobanking of human embryos; and as an advisor to the Food and Drug Administration on AIDS and cryobanking from 1988 to 1992.

== Personal life ==
Sherman met and married Hildegard Schroeder while they were both graduate students at the University of Iowa, and they had three children: Karen, Marc, and Keith. In addition to his professional activities, he has participated in organizations such as the Boy Scouts of America, the Jewish War Veterans organization, and the Lions Club.

Sherman died on December 1, 2023, at the age of 98.

== Awards ==
- Faculty Volunteer Service Award, University of Arkansas
- Outstanding Service Award, Veterans Association (1989-2005)
- Distinguished Faculty Award, University of Arkansas (1992)
- Distinguished Service Award, American Association of Tissue Banks (1994)
- Senior Arkansans Hall of Fame (1995)
- Silver Beaver Award, Boy Scouts of American (1998)
- Distinguished Alumni Award, University of Iowa (2006)
