= St. Bernards Medical Center =

- St. Bernards Healthcare
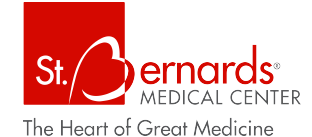

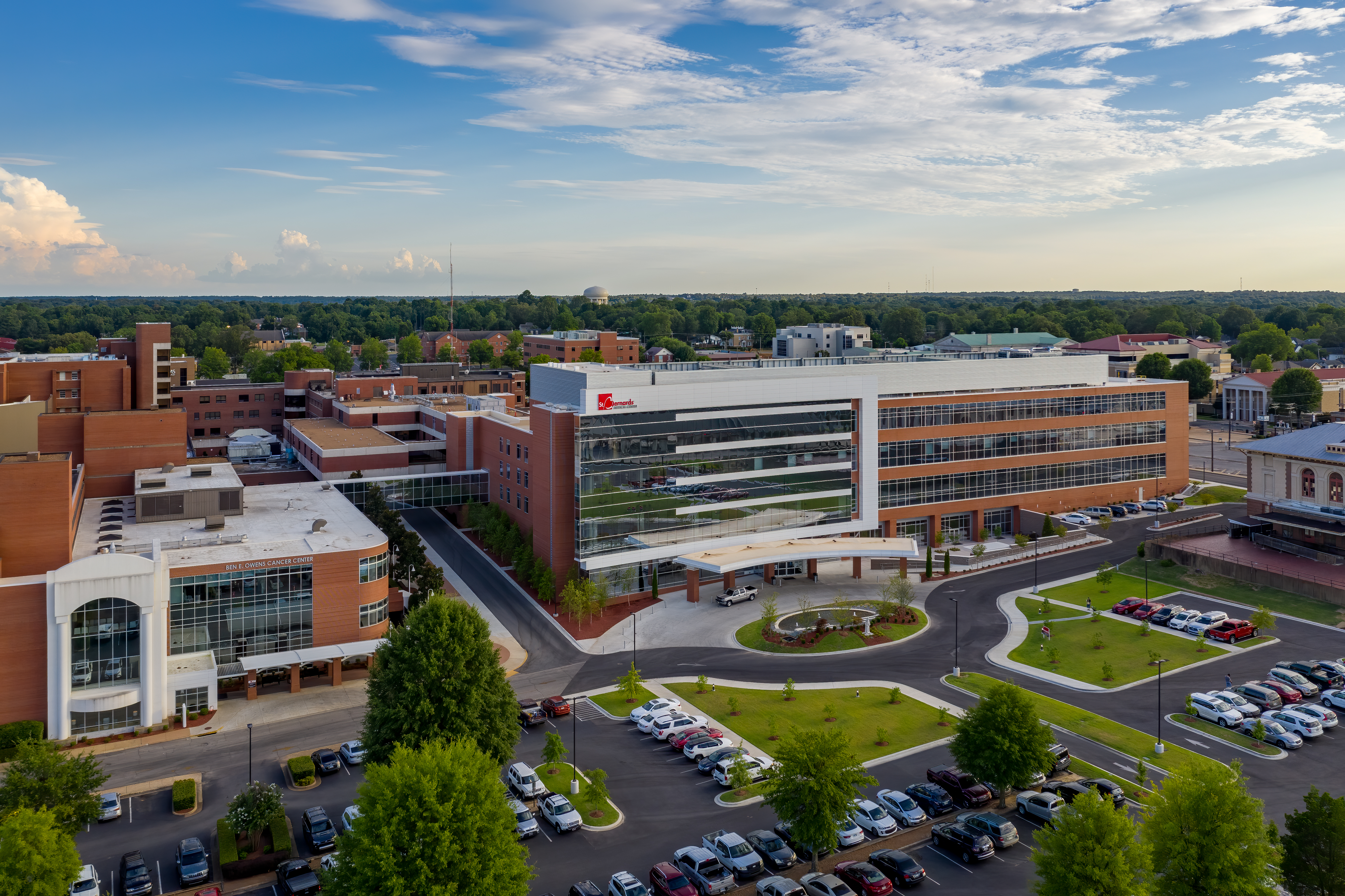

Geography
- Location: 225 East Washington Avenue, Jonesboro, Arkansas, United States
- Coordinates: 35.8365003°N 90.7025422°W

Organization
- Religious affiliation: Catholic church

Services
- Emergency department: Level III trauma center
- Beds: 454

Helipads
- Helipad: 0AR5
Number	Length		Surface
Number	ft	m	Surface
H1	42 x 42	13 x 13	Concrete

History
- Former name: St. Bernards Hospital
- Opened: July 5, 1900

Links
- Website: stbernards.info
- Lists: Hospitals in Arkansas

St. Bernards Medical Center is a 457-bed acute-care hospital in Jonesboro, Arkansas. The hospital, established on July 5, 1900, is the flagship facility of its nonprofit parent, St. Bernards Healthcare, serving as a regional referral center for 23 counties in northeast Arkansas and southeast Missouri. St. Bernards Medical Center houses the largest Level III trauma center and Neonatal Intensive Care Unit (NICU) in the eastern part of Arkansas.

== History ==
The hospital began in response to a malaria fever epidemic ravaging northeast Arkansas in 1899. Local physicians asked the Olivetan Benedictine Sisters to help take care of the sick. The sisters had come to Arkansas in 1887 to teach children of immigrants settling in the area. Initially, the sisters settled in Pocahontas, but they relocated their convent to Jonesboro in 1898. Malaria fever spread throughout the area the following year, and the sisters were asked to help, despite their training mostly in teaching. The sisters purchased a two-story, six-room frame house in Jonesboro and set up rooms with cots for beds and covered orange crates for wash stands. On July 5, 1900, St. Bernards Hospital, named after the sisters' patron saint, Bernardo Tolomei, took its first patients.

Within a week of its opening, most of the beds at St. Bernards were occupied by malaria patients. The sisters prepared food from their garden in the convent kitchen and did laundry at the convent, using tubs, washboards and homemade soap. Initially, local physicians instructed the sisters on medical techniques.

To help finance operations, the sisters made solicitation tours, riding the trains on payday to nearby logging camps to sell "Hospital Tickets." In exchange for $9, a workman would receive a ticket that ensured admission and care for an entire year. By the following year, the sisters purchased a second frame building and moved it next to the first, joining the two with a hallway.

By 1905, a 40-bed brick hospital and chapel were erected, connecting the convent with the original hospital building. Financial challenges continued throughout the years, but St. Bernards continued to grow, adding both buildings and services. The hospital survived floods that affected Arkansas in 1927 and 1937 and tornadoes that wreaked destruction in 1968 and 1973, providing care for the sick and injured.

By the 21st century, the hospital, now named St. Bernards Medical Center, expanded to a 454-bed, acute-care hospital with more than 2,700 employees.

== Service areas ==
St. Bernards Medical Center serves as a regional referral hospital across four areas of services, including heart and vascular, cancer, women's and children's services and senior services.

== Later changes ==
- In 2012, St. Bernards Medical Center opened the region's first Neonatal Intensive Care Unit (NICU). Previously, the closest NICU facilities were located in Little Rock or Memphis, TN.
- In 2016, the hospital's Cancer Center completed its renovation, expanding and combining all cancer services into a single facility.
- In 2018, the hospital expanded and renovated its HeartCare Center. The expansion focused on St. Bernards' invasive services by adding an electrophysiology lab and a hybrid lab. Meanwhile, the hospital renovated its cardiac catheterization laboratories.
- In December 2019, St. Bernards opened a 245,000 square foot, four-story tower, serving as the hospital's new main entrance. The tower includes 14 surgical suites, with the ability to expand up to 20, as well as a 46-bed intensive care unit (ICU). The project's total cost was $103 million.
