= Carolyn Pollan =

American politician (1937–2021)

Carolyn Joan Clark Pollan

Arkansas State Representative for Sebastian County
- In office 1975–1999
- Preceded by: Three at-large members
- Succeeded by: Jo Carson

Personal details
- Born: July 12, 1937 Houston, Texas, U.S.
- Died: October 23, 2021 (aged 84) Fort Smith, Arkansas, U.S.
- Party: Republican
- Education: Springdale High School John Brown University Walden University
- Occupation: Educator; businesswoman

Carolyn Pollan (July 12, 1937 – October 23, 2021) was an American politician who served twelve terms as a member of the Arkansas House of Representatives representing Fort Smith from 1975 to 1999. She left office when her eligibility expired, subject to the state term limits law.

== Early life and education ==
Carolyn Joan Clark was born in Houston, Texas on July 12, 1937, to parents Rex and Faith Basye Clark. Her father worked in the Texas oil fields before moving the family to Springdale, Arkansas to enter the poultry business.

Carolyn graduated from Springdale High School, then John Brown University. She earned her PhD in education from Walden University in Minneapolis, Minnesota.

She married George Angelo Pollan, a native of Fort Smith.

== Political career ==
During the 1960s, she became involved in Arkansas politics through her volunteer activities in support of Governor Winthrop Rockefeller.

=== Arkansas legislature ===
She first ran for the Arkansas legislature in 1974, winning a state House seat in a multi-seat district. The district would later become a single-member district. In all, she served 12 consecutive two-year terms from 1975 to 1999, when she was ineligible to run again due to Arkansas’ term limits law.

Among her notable achievements in the legislature, Pollan became the first woman to serve as associate speaker pro tempore in the Arkansas House of Representatives. She was also a leading advocate of the Equal Rights Amendment, although the movement for ratification failed in Arkansas as the movement stalled nationally.

=== Career after legislature ===
During the term of Governor Frank White in the early 1980s, she served as the governor's counsel and legislative advisor. Later, she worked with the legislature for Governor Mike Huckabee. She was also vice-chairman of the Arkansas Republican Party and served at various boards and committees.

== Honors ==
Her honors include "100 Top Women in Arkansas" by Arkansas Business magazine; "One of Ten Outstanding Legislators in the United States Award" by the National Assembly of Government, and the Associated Press Statewide Poll of 100 Influential People in Arkansas. She is a 2020 inductee into the Arkansas Women's Hall of Fame.

== Personal life ==
She remained married to George Angelo Pollan for 55 years until his death in 2017. She has three children, Cee Cee, Todd and Rob. Her church affiliation was Baptist.

== Death ==
Carolyn Pollan died on October 23, 2021.

Political offices
Preceded by Three at-large members, including Bernice Kizer	Arkansas State Representative from Sebastian County; 1975–1999	Succeeded by Jo Carson
