= Arkansas State Hospital =

Hospital in Little Rock, Arkansas

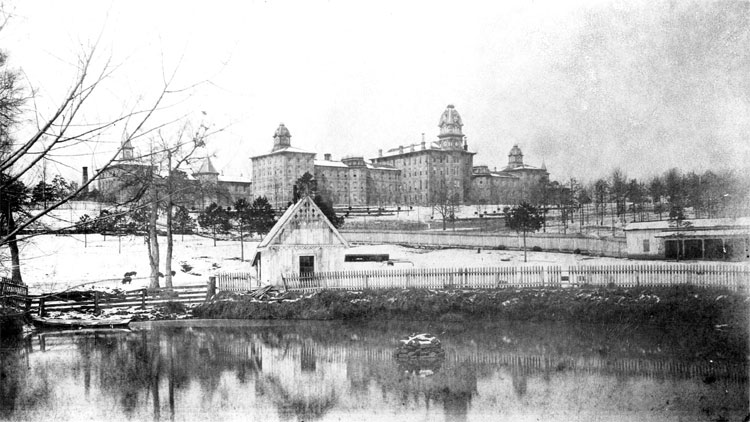
- Original Arkansas State Hospital building, 1891

Geography
- Location: 305 South Palm Street, Little Rock, Arkansas, United States
- Coordinates: 34.7507°N 92.3243°W

Organization
- Care system: Public

History
- Founded: 1883

Links
- Lists: Hospitals in Arkansas

Arkansas State Hospital, originally known as Arkansas Lunatic Asylum, is the sole public psychiatric hospital in the state of Arkansas, and is located in the city of Little Rock. It was established in 1883 and as of 2024, it is still active. Its main focus is on forensic treatment and evaluations as opposed to treatment of chronic illness.

== History ==
An act of the Arkansas legislature in 1873 approved the purchase of land and construction of a building to serve people with mental illness in the state. Due to the Brooks-Baxter War, construction was postponed until 1881, when a two-year tax was instituted to fund the construction and operation.

The Arkansas Lunatic Asylum opened on March 1, 1873; the first inmate had already been involuntarily committed days before. The original building was constructed in the Kirkbride design, which was common for institutions at that time. In the following decades, there was a repeating pattern of overcrowding followed by expansion. By 1915, there were twelve buildings on site.

The name was changed to Arkansas State Hospital for Nervous Diseases in 1905 and the Arkansas State Hospital in 1933. The total patient census at the end of 1934 was reported at 4,996, rising to 5,046 by the end of 1935; the capacity of the hospital was 1,750.

In the 1930s, a hospital farm was established at Baucum (Pulaski County), where some of the more physically able patients were forced to work unpaid on a dairy farm. There were about 100 inmates to start with at the farm. By 1936, the need for further expansion prompted the opening of the Benton Farm Colony, as it was then called, which was planned to hold about 2,000 inmates. The farm colony was segregated, with one dorm for white patients and another for Black patients. In 1957, the legislature ordered the cessation of all farm operations.

Before 1959, many people without mental illness were also sent to Arkansas, including people with intellectual and developmental disabilities (I/DD). In 1959, the Arkansas Children's Colony (now known as the Conway Human Development Center) was established, which would be specifically for people with I/DD.

By 1960, many of the original buildings were falling into disrepair. 6 million dollars of state funding was allotted for new buildings. Advocates brought concerns that the building was not safe for the patients. The original Kirkbride building was demolished in 1963.

Serial killer Donald Harding would spend four years bouncing between the hospital and several other facilities as a juvenile.

In 2008, a brand new hospital opened with 132 beds. In 2011, the Center for Medicare and Medicaid found substantial concerns for the life and safety of the patients, especially children, and threatened to withdraw federal funding. The State Hospital worked out sanctions and a plan to address the concerns.
