= Charlotte Tillar Schexnayder =

American journalist (1923–2020)

Member of the Arkansas House of Representatives from the 74th district
- In office January 14, 1985 – January 11, 1999
- Preceded by: Bain Poole
- Succeeded by: Lindbergh Thomas

Personal details
- Born: December 25, 1923 Tillar, Arkansas, U.S.
- Died: December 11, 2020 (aged 96) Little Rock, Arkansas, U.S.
- Party: Democratic

Charlotte Tillar Schexnayder (December 25, 1923 – December 11, 2020) was an American journalist and politician who served in the Arkansas House of Representatives from the 74th district from 1985 to 1999. In 2019 she was inducted into the Arkansas Women's Hall of Fame. Together with her late husband, Melvin J. Schexnayder, she owned and published the Dumas Clarion weekly newspaper in Dumas, Arkansas from 1954 to 1998.

Schexnayder died on December 11, 2020, in Little Rock, Arkansas at the age of 96.
