= NEA Baptist Memorial Hospital =

- Baptist Memorial Health Care
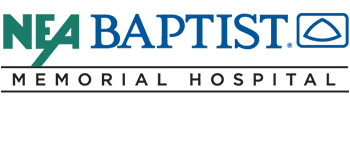

Geography
- Location: Jonesboro, Arkansas, United States
- Coordinates: 35°48′30″N 90°39′59″W

Services
- Emergency department: Level III trauma center
- Beds: 228

Helipads
- Helipad: Yes

History
- Founded: 1976

Links
- Website: www.baptistonline.org/...
- Lists: Hospitals in Arkansas

NEA Baptist Memorial Hospital is a 228-bed hospital in Jonesboro, Arkansas, and part of the NEA Baptist Health System and Baptist Memorial Health Care. The hospital is located on the NEA Baptist medical campus and is designated as a Level III trauma center by the Arkansas Department of Health.

== History ==
The hospital was founded in 1976 as NEA Medical Center. In 2007, it was renamed NEA Baptist Memorial Hospital after partnering with Baptist Memorial Health Care in Memphis.

In 2010, Baptist Memorial Health Care announced plans to merge with NEA Clinic. The health system later developed a new medical campus in Jonesboro that included NEA Baptist Memorial Hospital, NEA Baptist Clinic, and NEA Baptist Cancer Center.

== Services and facilities ==
NEA Baptist Memorial Hospital provides emergency care, cancer care, heart care, rehabilitation, surgical services, maternity care, wound care, and other inpatient and outpatient services.

The hospital is a six-story facility with 228 beds and expansion capacity for 300 beds.

The hospital is part of the NEA Baptist medical campus, which includes NEA Baptist Clinic and the Fowler Family Center for Cancer Care. The cancer center is a free-standing 34,000-square-foot facility that includes radiation therapy, chemotherapy, medical oncology, clinical research, and support services.

In 2025, the Arkansas Department of Health recognized NEA Baptist Memorial Hospital with a Ruby award for defect-free stroke care for the July 2023–June 2024 program year.

== See also ==
- List of hospitals in Arkansas
