= Northwest Arkansas Democrat Gazette =

Newspaper published in Fayetteville, Arkansas

Northwest Arkansas Democrat-Gazette
- Type: Daily newspaper
- Owner: Northwest Arkansas Newspapers
- Founded: 2016
- Headquarters: Fayetteville, Arkansas
- Circulation: 17,807
- ISSN: 1060-4332
- Website: nwaonline.com

Northwest Arkansas Democrat-Gazette (ISSN 1060-4332) is a daily newspaper in Fayetteville, Arkansas owned by Northwest Arkansas Newspapers and has circulation of 17,807 copies.

== History ==
The Democrat was founded on June 14, 1860, and operated under that name until 1893. The paper was then renamed to the Fayetteville Daily Democrat. In 1911, it was purchased by Jay Fulbright and upon his death in 1923 passed to his wife, Roberta Fulbright. She became president and publisher, renaming the paper to the Northwest Arkansas Times in 1937. Upon Fulbright's death in 1953, control of the paper passed to her son-in-law, Hal Douglas.

The Northwest Arkansas Times was formerly owned by the Thomson Corporation, who sold it to Hollinger in 1995; Hollinger sold it on to Community Publishers Inc., owned by Jim Walton, in 1999. In 2005, WEHCO Media bought the Northwest Arkansas Times and the Benton County Daily Record from CPI. In 2009, WEHCO and Stephens Media merged their northwest Arkansas papers into a joint venture, Northwest Arkansas Newspapers.

On Jan. 5, 2015, Northwest Arkansas Newspapers consolidated their four daily newspapers -- The Northwest Arkansas Times (ISSN 1066-3355), Benton County Record, Springdale Morning News, and Rogers Morning News—with the Northwest Arkansas edition of the Democrat-Gazette, creating the Northwest Arkansas Democrat-Gazette, with the former separate local papers serving as the local news section inside the newspaper.
