= Dorothy McFadden Hoover =

American physicist and mathematician

- Born: Dorothy Estheryne McFadden; July 1, 1918; Hope, Arkansas, US
- Died: February 7, 2000 (aged 81)
- Education: Arkansas Agricultural, Mechanical, and Normal College, BA; Atlanta University, MA; University of Arkansas, MA; University of Michigan, ABD
- Occupation(s): Physicist, mathematician
- Employer(s): NACA, NASA
- Known for: Pioneering theoretical mathematics research at NACA and NASA
- Spouses: Sylvanus Bowe Clarke (div.); Richard Allen Hoover (div.)

Dorothy Estheryne McFadden Hoover (July 1, 1918 – February 7, 2000) was an American physicist and mathematician. Hoover was a pioneer in the early days of NASA. Originally one of the first black women hired at Langley as a human computer, Hoover would eventually become a published physicist and mathematician. Hoover is one of the first black women to be listed as a co-author on NASA research publications. Her research supported the development of America's first jet fighter, the Sabre. Hoover's accomplishments were featured in Margot Lee Shetterly's bestselling book, Hidden Figures.

== Early life ==
Dorothy Estheryne McFadden was born in Hope, Arkansas on July 1, 1918, to William McFadden and Elizabeth Wilburn McFadden. She was the granddaughter of enslaved people and the youngest of four children. After graduating high school at the age of 15, Hoover enrolled at Arkansas Agricultural, Mechanical, and Normal College (AM&N). She graduated with a Bachelor of Science in Mathematics in 1938, two months shy of her twentieth birthday.

== Career ==
After teaching for a few years in Georgia, Hoover received her master's degree in mathematics from Atlanta University in 1943, for the thesis "Some Projective Transformations and Their Applications." She was then hired at the National Advisory Committee for Aeronautics (NACA, later NASA) in Langley in 1943 as a professional (P-1) mathematician. She was a part of a class of women, both black and white, hired to work as "human computers" and aid the development of aeronautical technology in the second World War.

Langley was originally segregated when Hoover began her work there, with black women assigned to work in the West Area of Langley. Hoover was thus initially assigned to the West Area of Computing. From here she showed promise, which led to her being one of the first West Area computers to be asked to join an integrated research group. Hoover then worked directly with NASA engineer Robert T. Jones, who was known as "one of the premier aeronautical engineers of the twentieth century". By 1946, Hoover was completing calculations and was widely relied on by Jones; her work was increasingly recognized as important to the aeronautics field. Hoover became one of the first black women published out of NACA/NASA. She published two articles in 1951 with co-author Frank S Malvestuto addressing "thin sweptback tapered wings" on aircraft. These articles both moved the development of high-speed aircraft in military and civilian life. Today, every aircraft involved in supersonic speed utilizes her design concepts, including commercial planes, fighter jets, and the space shuttle.

In 1952, Hoover left Langley with the title of an aeronautical research scientist. In 1954, she earned her second master's degree, this one in physics at the University of Arkansas. A portion of her 1954 master's thesis, "On Estimates of Error in Numerical Integration," was included in the Proceedings of the Arkansas Academy of Science the following year. She returned to civil service, first working in the U.S. Weather Bureau and then transferring to NASA's Goddard Space Flight Center. While at Goddard, Hoover became the first Black woman to be promoted to a GS-13, a prominent position within US federal government employment. After her retirement, Hoover wrote and published a book on the history of the African Methodist Episcopal Church, titled A Layman Looks with Love at Her Church.

Hoover's publications with Malvestuto should allow her to claim a finite Erdős number. Malvestuto has an Erdős number of seven.

== Death ==
Hoover died in Washington, DC in 2000.

== Books ==
- Hoover, Dorothy E. (1970). A layman looks with love at her church. Philadelphia, Pennsylvania: Dorrance. ISBN 0805913874. OCLC 88135.
