= Journal of Neuroinflammation =

- Discipline: Neuroimmunology
- Language: English
- Edited by: Sue T. Griffin, Monica J. Carson

Publication details
- History: 2004-present
- Publisher: BioMed Central
- Open access: Yes
- License: Creative Commons Attribution
- Impact factor: 10.1 (2024)

Standard abbreviations
- ISO 4: J. Neuroinflammation

Indexing
- CODEN: JNOEB3
- ISSN: 1742-2094
- OCLC no.: 55064649

Links
- Journal homepage

The Journal of Neuroinflammation is a peer-reviewed open-access scientific journal covering immunological responses of the nervous system. It was established in 2004 and is published by BioMed Central. The editors-in-chief are Sue T. Griffin (University of Arkansas for Medical Sciences) and Monica J. Carson (University of California, Riverside), who succeeded Robert E. Mrak (University of Toledo Medical Center) in 2018.

== Abstracting and indexing ==
The journal is abstracted and indexed in:

- Biological Abstracts
- BIOSIS Previews
- CAB International
- Chemical Abstracts Service
- Current Contents
- Embase
- Global Health
- Index Medicus/MEDLINE/PubMed
- Science Citation Index Expanded
- Scopus

According to the Journal Citation Reports, the journal has a 2024 impact factor of 10.1.
