= UAMS Northwest =

Satellite campus of the University of Arkansas for Medical Sciences

UAMS College of Medicine
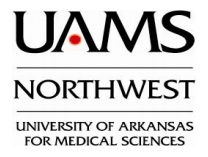
- Type: Public
- Established: 2008
- Parent institution: University of Arkansas for Medical Sciences Northwest
- Vice-Chancellor: Ryan Cork
- Location: Fayetteville, Arkansas, United States
- Website: nwa.uams.edu

The UAMS Northwest Regional Campus is community-based regional medical campus, and a satellite campus of the University of Arkansas for Medical Sciences. It was established in 2008 and has three mission areas: education, clinical, and research. The campus includes almost 350 medical, pharmacy, nursing and health professions students, 80 medical and pharmacy residents, and two sports medicine fellows. UAMS Northwest has 13 clinics in Northwest Arkansas, including internal and family medicine, a student-led clinic, orthopaedics and sports medicine, behavioral health/psychiatry, geriatrics, genetics counseling, transplant follow-up, and physical, occupational and speech therapy. The UAMS Institute for Community Health Innovation is the research and community outreach arm of the UAMS Northwest Campus. The institute explores innovative solutions for health care delivery and uses its research to develop community-based programs, inform policy, and transform standards of clinical care.
