= University of Arkansas for Medical Sciences =

Medical university in Little Rock, Arkansas, US

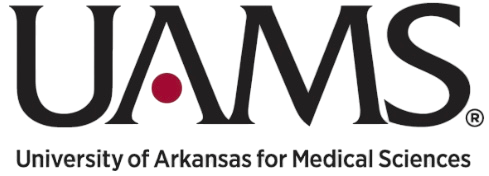
- Type: Public medical school
- Established: 1879
- Parent institution: University of Arkansas System
- Academic affiliations: Space-grant
- Chancellor: C. Lowry Barnes
- Provost: Stephanie Gardner
- Administrative staff: 11,098
- Students: 3,021
- Location: Little Rock, Arkansas, U.S. 34°44′58″N 92°19′12″W
- Campus: Urban
- Website: uams.edu

The University of Arkansas for Medical Sciences (UAMS) is a public medical school in Little Rock, Arkansas. It is part of the University of Arkansas System and consists of six colleges, seven institutes, several research centers, a statewide network of community education centers, and the UAMS Medical Center.

== History ==
In 1879, eight physicians, led by P.O. Hooper of Little Rock, each invested $625 to secure a charter for a medical school from Arkansas Industrial University (which later became the University of Arkansas). They purchased the Sperindio Restaurant and Hotel building on West Second Street in Little Rock for $5,000 to house the school, which opened on Oct. 7, 1879 with 22 students. In 1880, Tom Pinson was the first graduate of the medical school. In 1935, the medical school was moved to a new building next to the City Hospital in Little Rock. The six-story, $450,000 structure gave the School of Medicine a boost in clinical instruction of medical students. The hospital's physicians were members of the school's teaching faculty. The medical school building now houses the University of Arkansas at Little Rock's William H. Bowen School of Law; the hospital building was torn down and became the law school's parking lot.

In 1950, a 26-acre (110,000 m^{2}) tract of land on West Markham Street was formally deeded to the university by the Arkansas State Hospital, a state-owned psychiatric hospital.

In 1951, the School of Pharmacy was established making it a medical sciences campus, followed in 1953 by the School of Nursing. In 1956, the university, then known as University of Arkansas Medical Center (UAMC), moved to the West Markham campus where it is currently. The university also assumed control of City Hospital, which moved with it; it became known as University Hospital, and more recently UAMS Medical Center. In 1970, the School of Health Related Professions was approved by the University of Arkansas System Board of Trustees.

In 1975, the names of the schools on campus were changed to colleges and the executive officer's title became chancellor. In 1980, after being known by several different names through history, the institution's name changed to the University of Arkansas for Medical Sciences (UAMS).

In 1995, the UAMS Graduate School was granted independent status from the Graduate School at the University of Arkansas. In 2003, the College of Public Health opened. In 2005, the College of Public Health was named for the late Fay W. Boozman, a UAMS graduate who led the Arkansas Department of Health from 1998 until his death in 2005.

James L. Dennis was named the first chancellor. He was originally named vice president of health sciences in 1970, becoming chancellor in 1975 when the title of the institution's executive officer was changed. To honor his achievements the Section of Pediatrics building was named after him.

Harry P. Ward succeeded Dennis, served 21 years as chancellor and is credited with leading UAMS’ transformation from a small medical school with a charity hospital to an academic health center and research leader. The hospital's Harry P. Ward Tower is named for him.

I. Dodd Wilson followed Ward as chancellor. Wilson came to UAMS in 1986 as a professor and dean of the UAMS College of Medicine from the University of Minnesota Medical School, where he was a professor and vice chairman of the Department of Medicine. He was named chancellor in 2000 and retired in 2009. The I. Dodd Wilson Education building is named in his honor.

Dan Rahn was chosen as the fourth chancellor of UAMS in 2009. He previously served as president of the Medical College of Georgia and vice chancellor for health and medical programs for the University System of Georgia before coming to UAMS. Under Rahn's leadership and facing a budget deficit, UAMS launched efficiency measures that saved more than $100 million. Also during his tenure, UAMS opened a regional campus in Fayetteville and the UAMS Medical Center became the state's only adult Level 1 trauma center. Rahn retired from UAMS in 2017. Just prior to his retirement, UAMS named in his honor the Daniel W. Rahn Interprofessional Education Building, which houses the administrative offices for the colleges of Nursing, Pharmacy, Public Health and the university's interprofessional education program.

Cam Patterson succeeded Rahn, becoming chancellor in June 2018, following a national search. Provost and Senior Vice Chancellor for Academic Affairs Stephanie Gardner served as interim chancellor from Rahn's 2017 retirement until Patterson's arrival. A cardiologist and health care administrator, Patterson previously served since 2014 as senior vice president and chief operating officer of Weill-Cornell Medical Center and Komansky Children's Hospital/New York Presbyterian Hospital in New York.

== Organization ==
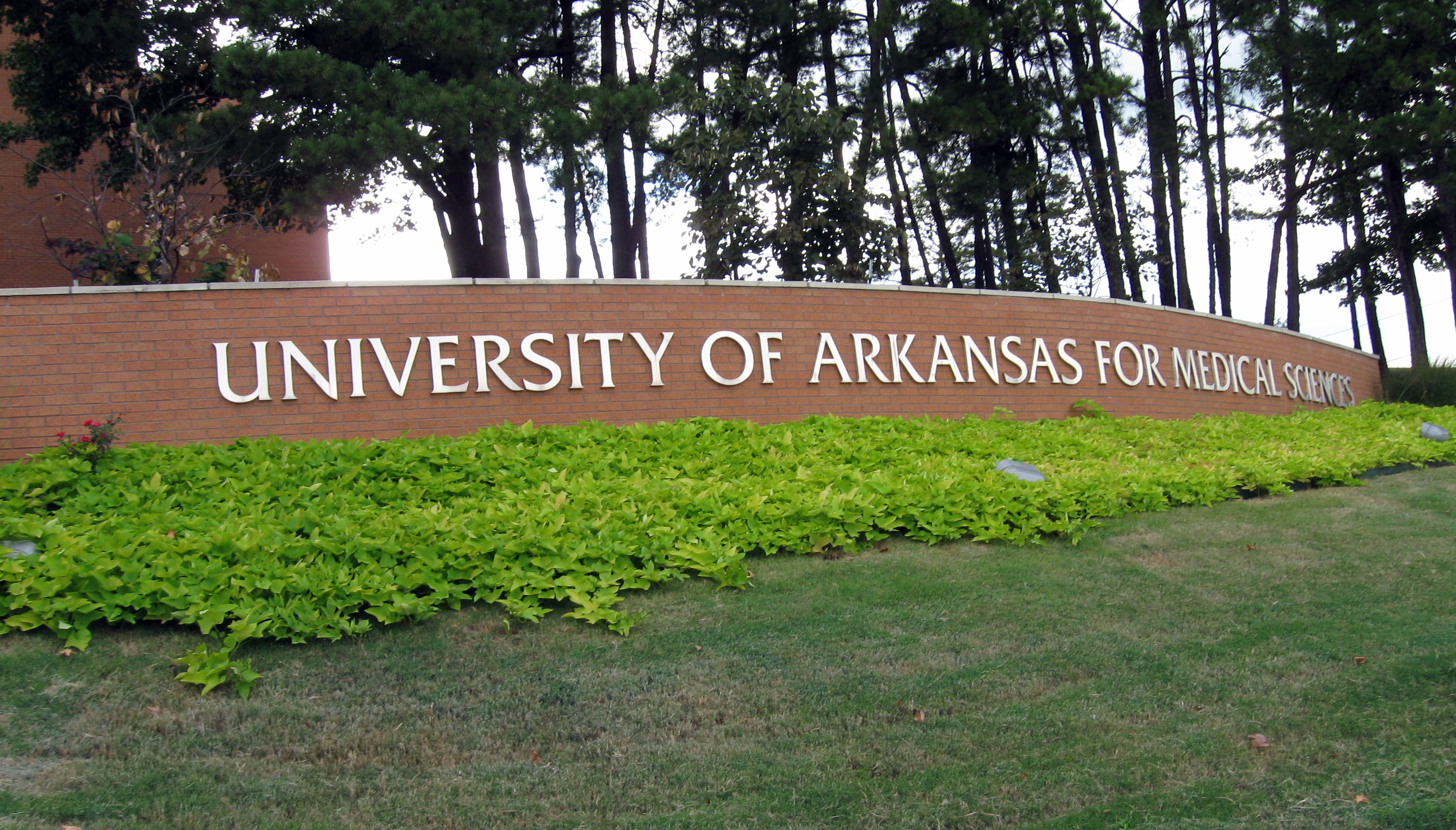
University of Arkansas for Medical Sciences

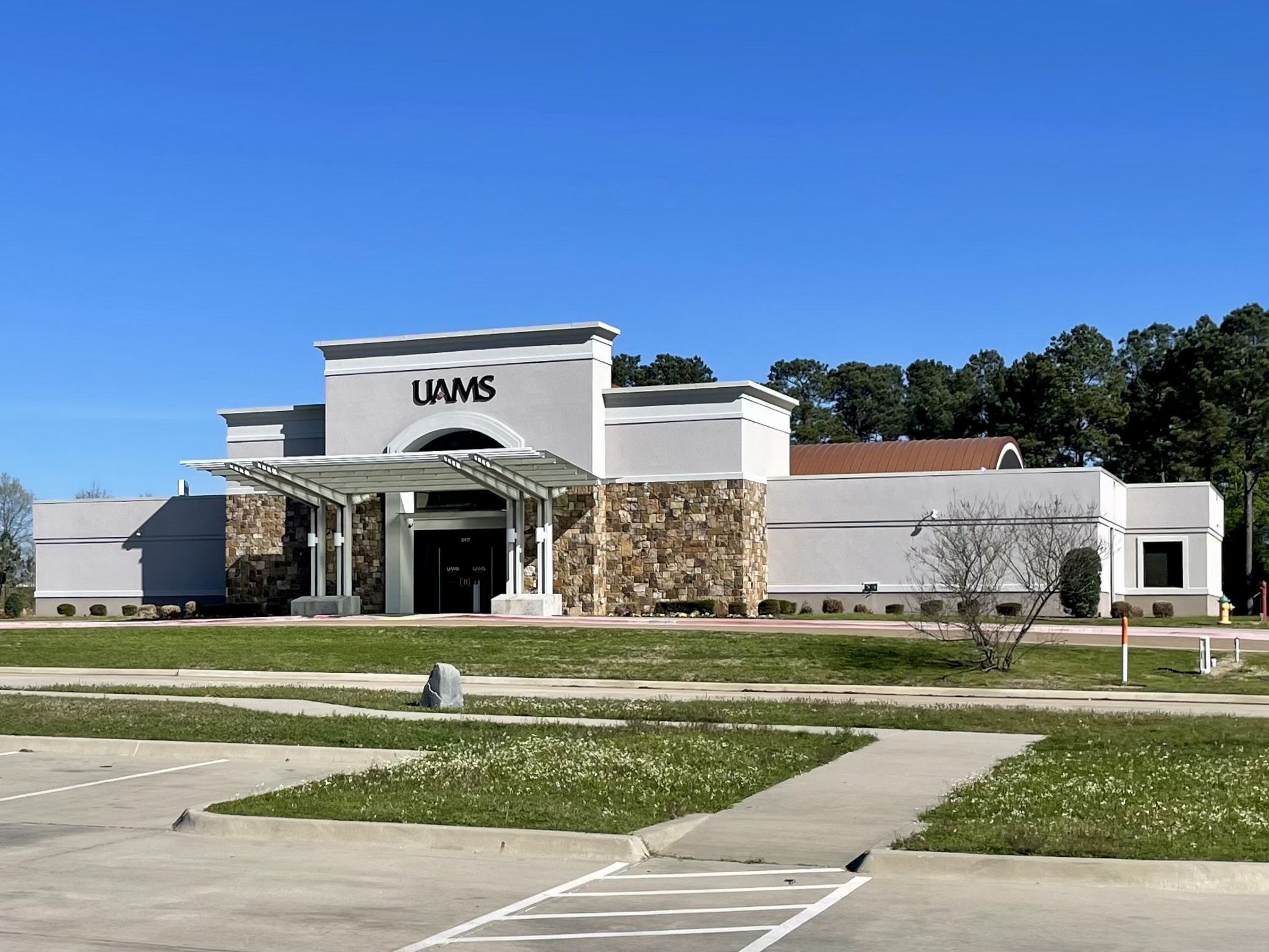
The University of Arkansas for Medical Sciences Southwest Regional Center in Texarkana

UAMS has 6 academic units:

1. UAMS College of Medicine
2. UAMS College of Pharmacy
3. UAMS College of Nursing
4. UAMS College of Health Professions
5. Fay W. Boozman College of Public Health
6. UAMS Graduate School

UAMS is an academic health center and medical school. It combines its education efforts with the patient care resources of a hospital and outpatient center and the specialized care and research at the following institutes:

1. Winthrop P. Rockefeller Cancer Institute
2. Harvey and Bernice Jones Eye Institute
3. Donald W. Reynolds Institute on Aging
4. Translational Research Institute
5. Psychiatric Research Institute
6. Jackson T. Stephens Spine & Neurosciences Institute
7. Institute for Digital Health & Innovation

John L. McClellan Memorial Veterans Hospital-VA Medical Center (Central Arkansas Veterans Healthcare System) and Arkansas Children's Hospital are affiliates of UAMS and contracts UAMS's physicians for clinical services. UAMS doctors are on staff at the two facilities and both serve as clinical locations for UAMS students and resident physicians to receive hands-on experience treating patients.

The community outreach efforts of UAMS include eight regional centers in Fayetteville, Pine Bluff, El Dorado, Texarkana, Fort Smith, Jonesboro, Helena, and Magnolia; networks of senior health centers and centers for young children with special health care needs; and interactive video education and medical consultation services to community hospitals around the state.

UAMS is the state's largest basic and applied research institution, with a total budget of $1.3 billion and more than $100 million in annual research funding, grants and contracts and internationally renowned programs in multiple myeloma, aging and other areas.

UAMS is the largest public employer in the state with more than 10,000 employees. As of fall 2015, UAMS had 3,021 students, including 694 medical students, 475 in the College of Pharmacy, 781 in the College of Nursing, 662 in the College of Health Professions, 180 in the College of Public Health and 229 in the Graduate School. There were also 789 resident physicians and 1,429 faculty members.

UAMS and its affiliates have a total economic impact in Arkansas of about $3.92 billion per year.

== Rankings and recognition ==
For 2022, out of 191 medical schools ranked by U S News & World Report UAMS was ranked #39 in Best Medical Schools: Primary Care, #75 in Best Medical Schools: Research, and #35 in Most Graduates Practicing in Primary Care Fields.

UAMS was the first medical center in Arkansas and among the first in the nation to implement a star rating system for UAMS physicians.

UAMS has the only high-risk pregnancy program, the only adult cystic fibrosis center, and the only liver and kidney transplant program in the state of Arkansas. UAMS is also home to 200 physicians featured in the list of Best Doctors in America, some of which are at Arkansas Children's Hospital and Central Arkansas Veteran's Healthcare System, where UAMS faculty serve as staff.

In 2003, UAMS implemented a telehealth program to enhance access to care for high-risk pregnant women living in rural areas.

In research, UAMS is working on multiple myeloma, geriatrics, vision, and spine treatment research and is home to the Arkansas Biosciences Institute and the UAMS Bioventures Business Incubator. UAMS is ranked in the top 20% of all US Colleges & Universities in research funding from Federal Government. In 2016, the university's research funding was more than $111.9 million. Clinical researchers at UAMS performed the first outpatient bone marrow transplant in the US, as well as the first gene therapy for multiple myeloma in the US. They are also home to a number of robotic, experimental, and advanced treatment facilities found nowhere else in the state of Arkansas.

== Campus ==
Undergraduate demographics as of Fall 2023
| Race and ethnicity | Total |
|---|---|
| White | 60% |
| Black | 11% |
| Hispanic | 10% |
| Asian | 9% |
| Unknown | 5% |
| Two or more races | 4% |
| International student | 1% |
Economic diversity
| Low-income (Note: The percentage of students who received an income-based federal Pell grant intended for low-income students.) | 29% |
| Affluent (Note: The percentage of students who are a part of the American middle class at the bare minimum.) | 71% |

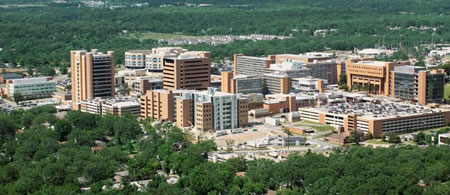
An aerial view of the UAMS main campus

The UAMS campus, now encompassing more than 84 acres (340,000 m^{2}), is located on Markham Street in Little Rock. The university moved to the property in 1956. The campus includes an estimated 5,200,000 square feet (480,000 m^{2}) of buildings.

Adjacent to the UAMS campus to the south is the John L. McClellan Veterans Administration Hospital, a part of the Central Arkansas Veterans Healthcare System. To the west are the Arkansas State Hospital grounds. Just south of the VA hospital is Interstate 630, a major east–west thoroughfare through Little Rock.

Off campus, UAMS owns or leases several properties, including its eight regional centers, 11 locations across Arkansas of its Kids First pediatric day health clinics, the Westmark building near their main campus, the Westside Campus facility on the Arkansas Children's Hospital campus and a portion of the Freeway Medical building in Little Rock. UAMS also owns over two dozen single family homes and numerous empty lots and parking lots immediately to the east of their main campus. Their master plan calls for the space between Pine street and Cedar street to continue to be purchased when possible as a target zone for future campus growth.

== Campus expansion ==
In 2004, UAMS embarked on the most significant expansion efforts in its history with a slate of projects to provide additional space for its education, patient care, research and outreach programs. The over $500 million expansion effort encompassed several expansion and renovation projects. The largest project was a 553,282-square-foot (51,401.6 m^{2}), $197 million expansion of the UAMS Medical Center, which includes new patient rooms, operating rooms and space for other programs and services. The hospital expansion was needed to replace the outdated original hospital building, which opened in 1956. The original hospital underwent renovation in phases to host new academic and research facilities

The 10-floor new hospital expansion includes 332 adult beds and 64 neonatal beds. The first 9 floors opened on January 19, 2009, with the 10th floor originally being a shell space for future expansion. Due to high hospital bed occupancy, that expansion was launched in 2011.

The hospital expansion was built at the site of the old student dormitory, which was imploded on Feb. 19, 2006. The dorm was replaced with a 92,000-square-foot (8,500 m^{2}), 177-unit Residence Hall, which opened to students in August 2006.

The six-floor, 110,000-square-foot (10,000 m^{2}) Psychiatric Research Institute facility, a 40-bed facility built adjacent to the hospital expansion, includes space for inpatient and outpatient treatment, education, research and administration. It opened in December 2008. A 1,000-car parking deck was built adjoining and underneath the hospital expansion and PRI.

On September 28, 2007, UAMS honored the late Winthrop P. Rockefeller, former Arkansas governor, by renaming its Arkansas Cancer Research Center (ACRC) for him while celebrating the groundbreaking for a major expansion to the facility. The 12-floor, $130 million, 330,000-square-foot (31,000 m^{2}) addition, located just north of the existing 11 story 200,000-square-foot (19,000 m^{2}) facility, allows the institute to treat more patients and host more research into new treatments. The addition opened in July, 2010.

A five-floor, 56,000-square-foot (5,200 m^{2}) addition to the Jones Eye Institute opened in April 2006. It is named the Pat Walker Tower for the Springdale philanthropist whose gift made the project possible.

In 2010, construction began on a four-floor, 55,000-square-foot (5,100 m^{2}) addition to the Donald W. Reynolds Institute on Aging. The $30.4 million addition was built on top of the existing four-story 96,000-square-foot (8,900 m^{2}) building, established by a similar grant from the Donald W Reynolds Foundation in 2000.

An approximately 43,000-square-foot (4,000 m^{2}) I. Dodd Wilson Education Building was completed in 2008, including 14 25-seat classrooms, two 40-seat classrooms and two 214-seat auditoriums.

UAMS assisted with the construction of a 148,000-square-foot (13,700 m^{2}) new state hospital in return for the land where the new residence hall is located and most of the old state hospital buildings that transferred to UAMS when construction was completed in 2008. Those renovated buildings now house programs for the College of Health Professions.

A regional campus in Northwest Arkansas opened in the 2009–2010 academic year in the former Washington Regional Medical Center hospital. The UAMS Northwest campus further expands UAMS student enrollment in medicine, pharmacy, nursing, and allied health and accommodates additional medical residents.

In 2021, UAMS broke ground on two new buildings on the main campus in Little Rock: a new radiation oncology and proton center and a new surgical hospital.

== Notable people ==
=== Alumni ===
- Warren L. Carpenter, highly decorated Air Force physician involved in early designs of the space suit and the F16 cockpit.
- William J. Darby, founder of the first nutrition research center at an American medical school at Vanderbilt University, member of the National Academy of Sciences, and widely regarded nutrition scientist.
- Joycelyn Elders, 15th Surgeon General of the United States and first black Surgeon General.
- Edith Irby Jones, first black graduate from a medical school in the American South.
- Samuel L. Kountz, pioneer of kidney transplant surgery and co-developer of one of the first kidney perfusion machines.
- Harry M. Meyer, co-developer of the Rubella vaccine.
- Lidia Gertrudis Sogandares, first female physician in Panama.

=== Faculty and staff ===
- Sue T. Griffin, one of the first researchers to report a connection between inflammation and Alzheimer's Disease
- Jerome K. Sherman, expert in cryobiology and pioneer of sperm banking and artificial insemination. Reported the first successful pregnancies using cryopreserved sperm.
- Nancy Snyderman, physician, author, and journalist who worked for NBC and frequently appeared on television. She practiced as a surgeon at UAMS from 1983 to 1988. Her career in medical journalism began on KARK-TV during this time.
- Gazi Yasargil, Turkish medical scientist and neurosurgeon. In 1999 he was honored as "Neurosurgery’s Man of the Century 1950–1999" at the Congress of Neurological Surgeons Annual Meeting.
