= Central Arkansas Veterans Healthcare System =

Central Arkansas Veterans Healthcare System (CAVHS) is an American veteran healthcare provider. The system has two hospitals in Little Rock and North Little Rock in Arkansas. It is a flagship of United States Department of Veterans Affairs (VA) and is one of the largest and busiest VA medical centers in the country.

== History ==
During the 1918 influenza epidemic, a barracks in Fort Roots, North Little Rock was converted to a hospital ward to accommodate the increased patient load. By 1921, the barracks was transferred to the Public Health Service for use as a veterans’ hospital. In December 1945, Senator John L. McClellan approved a 500-bed hospital for veterans to be built on Roosevelt Road in Little Rock.

The U.S. Department of Veterans Affairs announced the approval of the Central Arkansas Veterans Health Care System as one of only 12 new Fisher House program priority sites on January 26, 2021.

In August 2021, the system benefited from a $209,000 grant from US Department of Veteran Affairs to fight homelessness in Little Rock.

In June 2020, Logan University partnered with Central Arkansas Veterans Healthcare System to allow chiropractic students complete their clinical rotations at CAVHS to gain hands-on educational experience.

== Services ==
The system provides inpatient and outpatient health care services, from disease prevention through primary care, to complex surgical procedures, to extended rehabilitative care, mental health care, physical medicine and rehabilitation, neurology, dentistry, ophthalmology, geriatrics and extended care, and women's health.
