= Arkansas Children's Hospital =

Level I Trauma Center & Pediatric Hospital in Little Rock, Arkansas, United States

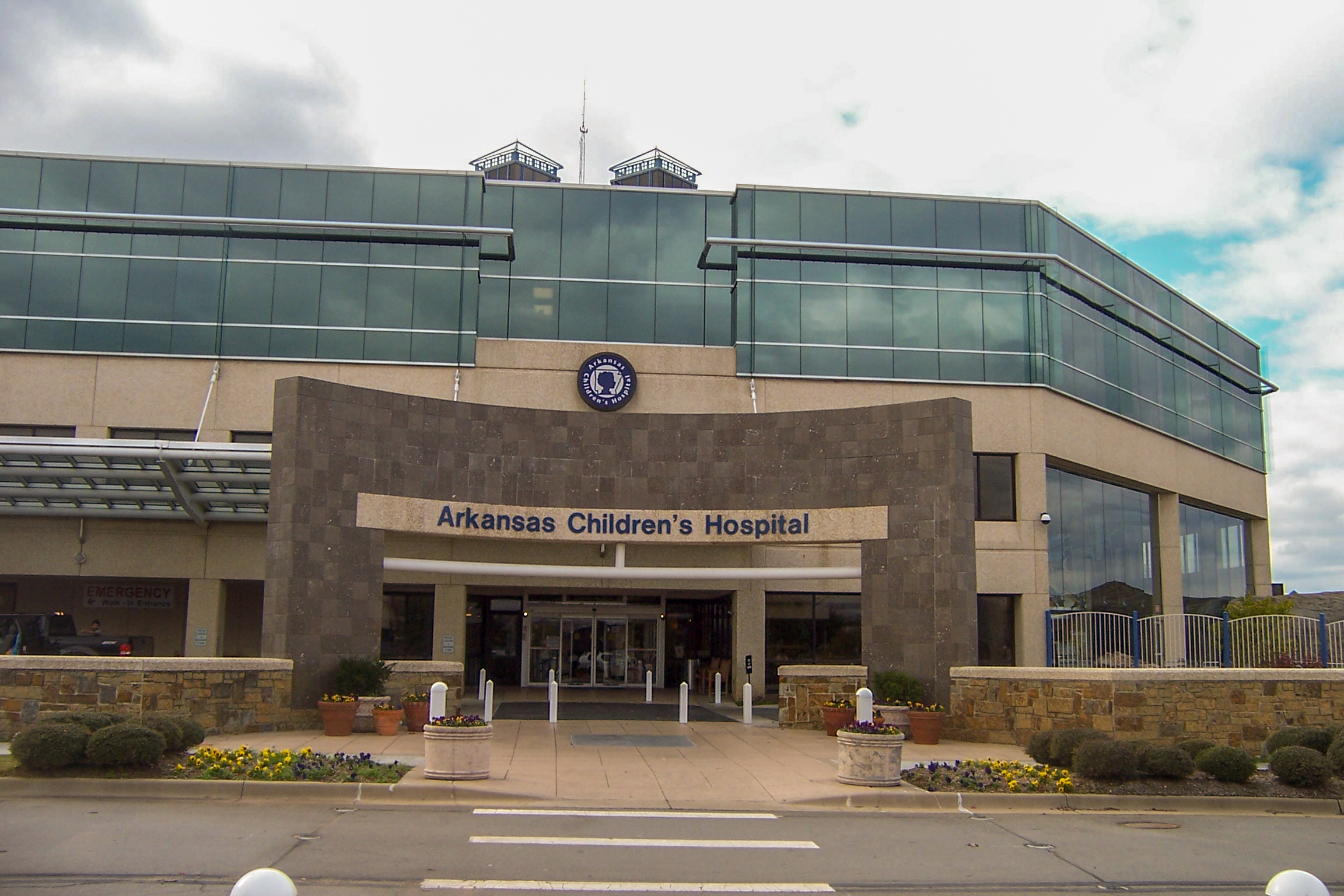

Geography
- Location: Little Rock, Arkansas, US United States
- Coordinates: 34°44′36″N 92°17′29″W

Organisation
- Care system: Private
- Type: Specialist
- Affiliated university: UAMS College of Medicine

Services
- Emergency department: Level I Pediatric Trauma Center
- Beds: 336
- Speciality: Pediatrics

History
- Founded: 1912

Links
- Website: www.archildrens.org

Arkansas Children's Hospital (ACH) is a pediatric hospital with a Level I trauma center in Little Rock, Arkansas. It is among the largest in the United States, serving infants, children, teens, and young adults from birth to age 21. ACH is affiliated with the University of Arkansas for Medical Sciences and serves as a teaching hospital with the UAMS College of Medicine's Department of Pediatrics. ACH staff consists of more than 505 physicians, 200 residents, and 4,400 support staff. The hospital includes 336 licensed beds, and offers three intensive care units. The campus spans 36 city blocks and has a floor space of over 1,200,000 square feet (110,000 m^{2}).

Marcy Doderer is president & CEO of Arkansas Children's Hospital, succeeding Dr. Jonathan Bates after his 2013 retirement.

Arkansas Children's has built a 233,613-square foot hospital in Springdale. Arkansas Children's Northwest will serve the 200,000 children who live in that 11-county area. The facility opened in February 2018. Wal-Mart and the Wal-Mart Foundation have invested $8 million in the project, while J.B. Hunt has given $5 million toward the construction.

First Lady of Arkansas Hillary Clinton served on the board of the Arkansas Children's Hospital Legal Services from 1988 to 1992.

== Departments ==
=== Arkansas Children's Northwest Arkansas ===
The hospital includes 233,613 square feet of inpatient beds, emergency care, clinic rooms and diagnostic services. Outpatient services in the facility opened in early January 2018. Inpatient care in the hospital's 24 private beds began in February 2018.

=== Arkansas Children's Research Institute ===
Arkansas Children's Research Institute (ACRI) is a free-standing pediatric research center on the ACH campus. The center is designed to help faculty members from the University of Arkansas for Medical Sciences investigate disease development and treatment in infants, children and adolescents. Physician and biomedical scientist investigators at ACRI and the Arkansas Children's Nutrition Center (ACNC) research clinical, basic science, and health services to learn how to treat and prevent illnesses and diseases in children.

ACRI has about 120 scientists on staff. Recent grants include an $11.5 million award from the National Institutes of Health to establish a pediatric research center dedicated to translational research.

In 2016, Arkansas Children's Research Institute received a $9.4 million award from the National Institutes of Health's Institutional Development Award program to create a center to study childhood obesity: the Center of Biomedical Research Excellence (COBRE). The grant will provide the funds over five years to support COBRE research.

=== Arkansas Children's Foundation ===
Running for over 35 years, Arkansas Children's Foundation has funded Arkansas Children's Hospital in research and care. The largest gift to the Arkansas Children's Foundation helped complete the hospital's new facility in Springdale. The Tyson family and Tyson Family Foods committed $15 million to the project, which created the Tyson Family Tower at Arkansas Children's Northwest. The tower anchors the new facility, which includes 233,613 square feet of inpatient beds, emergency care, diagnostic services and clinical space. Wal-Mart and the Wal-Mart Foundation invested $8 million in the project, while J.B. Hunt gave $5 million toward the construction.

=== Arkansas Children's Hospital ===
Arkansas Children's Hospital (ACH) is a pediatric hospital with a Level I Pediatric Trauma Center, that's located in Little Rock, Arkansas. It is among the largest pediatric hospitals in the United States, and serves children from birth to age 21. ACH is affiliated with the University of Arkansas for Medical Sciences and is a teaching hospital with the UAMS College of Medicine's Department of Pediatrics. The hospital also features a burn unit which is one of two in the United States (other being Akron Children's) that treats both pediatric and adult burn patients. The hospital also features the only level 4 NICU in the state, which means they can care for newborns with the most complex health requirements.

== National recognition ==
=== Awards ===
U.S. News & World Report ranked Arkansas Children's Hospital as one of the Best Children's Hospitals in four specialties in 2017-18 – Pediatric Cardiology & Heart Surgery, Neonatology, Pediatric Pulmonary and Pediatric Urology.

In 2017, Arkansas Children's Hospital achieved Magnet recognition from the American Nurses Credentialing Center. Arkansas Children's was also recognized by the Cribs for Kids National Safe Sleep Hospital certification program as a Gold Certified Safe Sleep Champion. This certification recognizes safe sleep practices for newborns at the hospital, as well as education provided to parents for safe sleep at home.

Arkansas Children's is a designated Level 4 Epilepsy Center, meaning board-certified specialists deliver the most advanced care for epilepsy in the world.

The 2016 list of "Best Doctors in America" features several physicians on staff at Arkansas Children's Hospital. More than 100 additional physicians included in the list were affiliated more generally with the University of Arkansas for Medical Sciences Health System

The Children's Hospital Association named Arkansas Children's Hospital a finalist for a Pediatric Quality Award in 2015. The organization highlighted ACH for its work to increase hand hygiene compliance rates among patient care staff.

In 2011, Arkansas Children's Hospital set a national record for pediatric heart transplants conducted in a year. The hospital transplanted new hearts into 31 children and adults that year.

ACH is one of the largest employers in Arkansas and Fortune magazine named the hospital in its top 100 "Best Companies to Work For" in 2008, 2009, 2010 and 2011.

As of 2021-22 Arkansas Children's Hospital has placed nationally in 4 different ranked pediatric specialties on U.S. News & World Report.

2021-22 U.S. News & World Report Rankings for Arkansas Children's Hospital
Specialty	Rank (In the U.S.)	Score (Out of 100)
Pediatric Cardiology & Heart Surgery	#50	65.1
Pediatric Nephrology	#50	63.0
Pediatric Pulmonology & Lung Surgery	#34	73.6
Pediatric Urology	#47	51.3

=== News ===
When Hurricane Katrina first hit New Orleans in August 2005, Arkansas Children's (along with other hospitals) sent helicopters to Tulane Medical Center, Ochsner, and CHNOLA in order to help evacuate pediatric patients from the hospital.

As Arkansas Children's continued efforts to build a new hospital in Springdale, the Tyson family and Tyson Family Foods committed $15 million to the project, marking the largest gift the organization had ever received. The gift created the Tyson Family Tower at Arkansas Children's Northwest, anchoring the new facility which will include 233,613 square feet of inpatient beds, emergency care, diagnostic services and clinical space.

In August 2016, Arkansas Children's Research Institute announced that it had received a $9.4 million award from the National Institutes of Health's Institutional Development Award program to create a center for the study of childhood obesity. Drs. Judith Weber and Elisabet Borsheim will lead the Center of Biomedical Research Excellence. The award marked the first COBRE program at Arkansas Children's, and provided funding and support for the center's first five years.

In 2013, Arkansas Children's Hospital successfully treated 12-year-old Kali Hardig for primary amoebic meningoencephalitis. Her case became national news because she is one of only two known survivors of this disease, which she contracted after swimming in a warm-water lake park. Physicians at Arkansas Children's Hospital credit Kali's mother Traci with acting swiftly to get her child to the Emergency Department, saving her life. A team of laboratory staff, infectious disease physicians, critical care specialists and rehabilitation medicine experts worked with Kali for weeks to help her overcome the devastating illness. Anti-fungal medications and antibiotics were used. Physicians also contacted the CDC to get permission to use an experimental anti-amoeba drug that had to be shipped from the Atlanta headquarters. Arkansas Department of Health officials said 99 percent of people who contract the naegleria fowleri parasite die. Kali spent 22 days in the Pediatric Intensive Care Unit at ACH, followed by several weeks on the hospital's rehabilitation floor before going home.

In 2007 ACH treated the case of 20-month-old Jacob Esses, which spurred the recall of the Aqua Dots toy. After swallowing a number of the toy beads, 1,4-Butanediol coating the beads was metabolized to Gamma-Hydroxybutyric Acid (GHB, a recreational anesthetic). The drug has been shown to cause unconsciousness, drowsiness, seizures, coma, or death.

ACH has been profiled a number of times on the Discovery Health Channel. On December 21, 2006, the program Surgery Saved My Life featured a 17-year-old patient of ACH who had undergone four heart surgeries.

In the fall of 2007, the program examined how three physicians in the Arkansas Children's Hospital Vascular Anomalies Center of Excellence handled patients' potentially fatal vascular tumors. Featured in the documentary were James Suen, M.D., a head and neck surgeon at ACH and the University of Arkansas for Medical Sciences (UAMS); Lisa Buckmiller, M.D., medical director of the ACH Vascular Anomalies Center; and Rick Jackson, M.D., a surgeon at the hospital and associate professor of surgery in the UAMS College of Medicine. One patient featured in the profile was a 12-year-old girl who was born in Shanghai with what is believed to be the largest vascular tumor ever seen; Chinese surgeons had been reluctant to operate on the tumor.

Discovery Health's Extreme Surgery has also featured the hospital.

=== Accreditation and membership ===
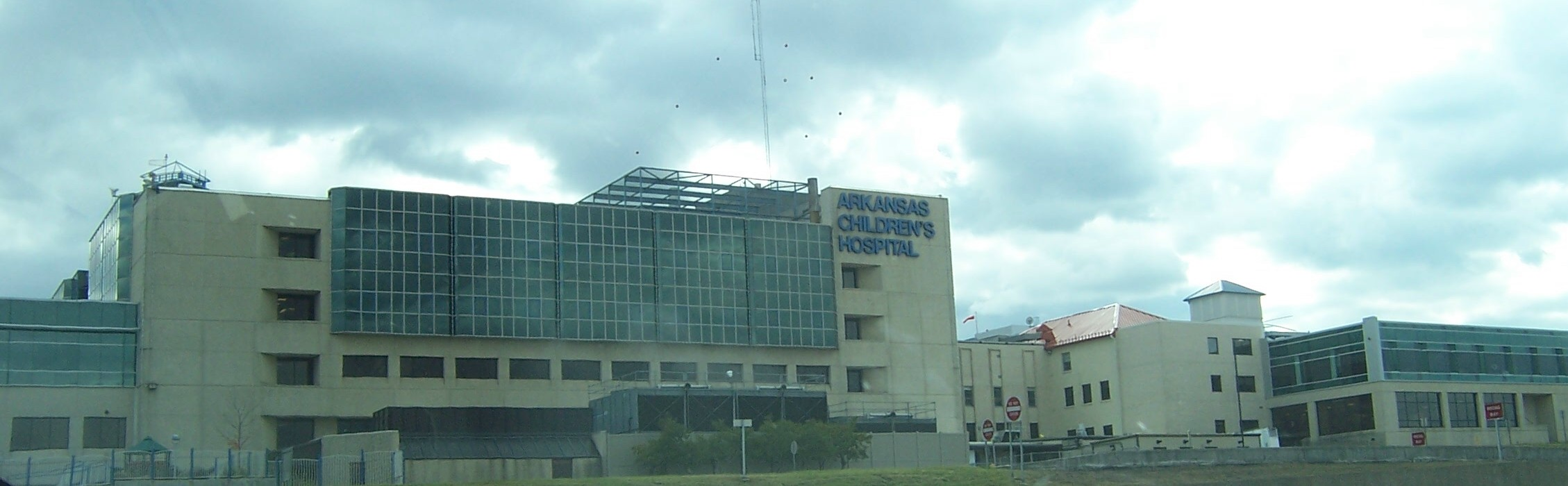

Accreditation

ACH holds accreditation with the following agencies:

- American Sleep Disorders Association
- The Joint Commission on Accreditation of Healthcare Organizations
- American Dental Association
- College of American Pathologists
- Commission on Accreditation of Medical Transport Systems
- Commission on Accreditation of Rehabilitation Facilities (Failed 2009)
- American Association of Blood Banks
- American Society of Hospital Pharmacists
- National Safe Sleep Certification Program
- Magnet Recognition

Membership

ACH holds membership in the following organizations:

- American Hospital Association
- Arkansas Hospital Association
- Association for the Care of Children's Health
- Children's Miracle Network
- Child Health Corporation of America
- Hospitals for a Healthy Environment (H2E)
- National Association of Children's Hospitals and Related Institutions, Inc.
- National Fire Protection Association
