= Schaal =

Schaal may refer to:

== People ==
- David Schaal (actor) (born 1963), English actor
- Richard Schaal (1928–2014), American actor
- Wendy Schaal (born 1954), American actress, daughter of Richard
- Kristen Schaal (born 1978), American comedian
- Barbara A. Schaal (born 1947), American biologist
- François Ignace Schaal (1747–1833), French general during the Revolutionary Wars and Napoleonic Wars
- Lucas Schaal (born 1990), German politician
- Paul Schaal (1943–2017), American baseball player
- Stefan Schaal, American engineer

== Place ==
- Schaal, Arkansas
- Schaalsee, a lake in Germany

== Other ==
- Johan Cruijff-schaal, a Dutch football trophy
- Schaal (surname)
