= Andrew de Burgh =

English film director (born 1990)

- Born: Andrew de Burgh Sidley; 16 June 1990 (age 36); Shrewsbury, Shropshire, United Kingdom
- Education: Pepperdine University (BA)
- Occupations: Film director; screenwriter; producer
- Years active: 2015–present

Andrew de Burgh Sidley (born 16 June 1990) is a British filmmaker. He began his career with Just One Drink (2015), a psychological thriller short film about a mysterious woman who uses Facebook to lure two young men to her apartment for a New Year’s Eve party.

After founding the production company Sacred Ember Films, he made his feature film debut with the science fiction film The Bestowal (2019), which premiered at MegaCon.

His second feature film as writer-director, the horror-thriller The Seductress from Hell (2024) had its World Premiere at the Glendale International Film Festival and its Los Angeles premiere at the Micheaux Film Festival.

== Early life and education ==
de Burgh was born in Shrewsbury, Shropshire and moved with his family to Binfield, Berkshire as a child. Fascinated with movies from a young age, early favorites of his included Toy Story (1995), Small Soldiers (1998) and Star Wars: Episode I - The Phantom Menace (1999). He studied at Lambrook in Winkfield and spent a lot of his teenage years watching movies at the Vue Cinema in Reading, Berkshire.

He was inspired to become a professional filmmaker after watching Christopher Nolan's Batman Begins (2005). Relocating to the United States, he attended Pepperdine University in Malibu, where he double majored in Film Studies and Advertising. While in college, he wrote, produced, directed and acted in numerous student films.

== Career ==
In 2015, de Burgh wrote, produced and directed the psychological thriller short film Just One Drink. Starring Barbara Nedeljakova, the film premiered at the Chinese American Film Festival and scored a 100% rating on the review aggregator site Rotten Tomatoes. In her review of the film, Dread Central critic Staci Layne Wilson called de Burgh "a promising young director". In 2016, he played series regular Sean Mercer in season five of the Daytime Emmy nominated web series Youthful Daze alongside Chrishell Stause, Melissa Archer, Bryan Dattilo, Sarah Joy Brown, Eden Riegel and Sean Kanan.

In 2017, he wrote, produced and directed the short silent film The Twisted Doll which premiered at the Polish Film Festival Los Angeles. In the same year, he wrote and directed the virtual reality horror short film Queen of Hearts which starred Christina Calph of the film Arthur.

After founding the production company Sacred Ember Films, he wrote, produced and directed the science fiction film The Bestowal (2019) which had its World Premiere at MegaCon and screened at the Dhaka International Film Festival. It had its Virginia premiere at the Clifton Film Celebration, where it was nominated for Best Feature Film. Starburst critic Ryan Pollard called it "unique, challenging and thought-provoking". The film tells the story of a suicidal businessman (Sam Brittan) who is visited by an inter-dimensional being appearing in the form of a beautiful woman (Sharmita Bhattacharya).

In 2021, de Burgh co-produced and directed the animated short film The Legend of Santa. Based on the children's book A Magical Christmas Adventure by author Daniel Colyer, the film tells an origin story of Santa Claus based on Saint Nicholas in the 4th century.

Season One of his TV series as creator and writer-director, the crime thriller The Twisted Doll (2024-2025) released on October 31, 2024, on ZEE5 and Cpics. Executive produced by Kavi Raz, the show tells the story of a young Indian woman who embarks on a revenge mission in Los Angeles after her and her husband are scammed by two real estate agents. Starring Summer Singh, Xander Bailey, Bree Mignano, Felix Merback and Andrew Ghai in the lead roles, it also featured guest appearances from Will Roberts of Oppenheimer and Chelsea Gilson of Hawaii Five-0.

His second feature film, the horror-thriller The Seductress from Hell (2024), which starred Jason Faunt, James Hyde and Andrew Lauer had its World Premiere at the 2024 Glendale International Film Festival and its Los Angeles premiere at the Micheaux Film Festival where de Burgh was nominated for the festival's Outstanding Directing for a Feature Award. In his review of the film, Film Threat critic Terry Sherwood gave it a score of 7 out of 10, stating that it is "quirky enough to fit next to the more extreme Asian and European offerings".

The claymation short film The Magic of Santa Claus (2025), which he wrote, produced and directed, premiered at the 2025 Dhaka International Film Festival and screened at the Glendale International Film Festival. The film tells a story of Santa Claus receiving tragic news just as he's about to travel around the world to deliver presents on Christmas Eve.

His third feature film, the horror comedy The Demoness (2026), which starred Akihiro Kitamura, Riley Nottingham, Bella Glanville, Sydney Culbertson, Mark Pontarelli, Haruka Igarashi and Amelia Gotham, was released on Video on demand on January 5, 2026. It tells the tale of a demonic succubus who visits Earth to torment the human race. Norman Gidney of HorrorBuzz gave it a 6 out of 10, writing "The pace could be better and the dialogue could be polished but The Demoness is at least fun". Douglas Davidson of Elements of Madness gave it a 2.5 out of 5 and compared it to the Terrifier series, stating "In an era of Art the Clown, where violence can occur for the sake of it, sometimes mayhem can scratch an itch something more cerebral can’t satisfy; yet, in the absence of intellectualism, even creature kills lose their luster". Lúcio Reis Filho of Film Obsessive praised the film, writing "de Burgh’s The Demoness is a refreshing, provocative piece in the landscape of contemporary horror cinema. Although at first glance it may pass for a mere ‘blast from the past’, the film goes much further, presenting a critical approach and a distinctly modern visual aesthetic". In his review of the film, Don Anelli of Asian Movie Pulse wrote "The film’s true strength lies in its unapologetic energy. There is a palpable sense of glee in the succubus’ execution of her victims".

== Personal life ==
de Burgh lives in Los Angeles and is a supporter of Liverpool F.C.. In his free time, he enjoys watching movies and playing video games.

== Filmography ==
=== Feature films ===
- The Bestowal (2019)
- The Seductress from Hell (2024)
- The Demoness (2026)

=== Television ===
- The Twisted Doll (2024-2025)

=== Short films ===
- Just One Drink (2015)
- The Twisted Doll (2017)
- Queen of Hearts (2017)
- The Legend of Santa (2021)
- The Magic of Santa Claus (2025)
