= The Seductress from Hell =

2024 film by Andrew de Burgh

- Directed by: Andrew de Burgh
- Written by: Andrew de Burgh
- Produced by: Andrew de Burgh; Oleksii Strykun; Raj Jawa
- Starring: Jason Faunt; James Hyde; Andrew Lauer; Rocio Scotto; Raj Jawa; Kylie Rohrer
- Cinematography: Khoi Nguyen
- Edited by: Ivan Ortega
- Music by: Elezeid
- Production companies: Garaj Pictures; Sacred Ember Films
- Release date: September 28, 2024 (Glendale International Film Festival)
- Running time: 102 minutes
- Country: United States
- Language: English
- Budget: $1 million

The Seductress from Hell is a 2024 American horror thriller film written, co-produced and directed by Andrew de Burgh. A Garaj Pictures and Sacred Ember Films co-production, the film stars Jason Faunt, James Hyde, Andrew Lauer, Rocio Scotto, Raj Jawa and Kylie Rohrer.

Set in Los Angeles, the plot follows a struggling Hollywood actress who undergoes a horrific transformation after being pushed to the edge by her psychopathic husband.

The Seductress from Hell had its World Premiere at the Glendale International Film Festival on September 28, 2024 and its Los Angeles premiere at the Micheaux Film Festival on October 24, 2024.

== Premise ==
Zara Pereira is an actress stuck in a miserable marriage with her psychopathic salesman husband Robert. One day, after a dinner party with their friends that goes horribly wrong, Zara undergoes a transformation and transforms into her alter-ego The Seductress from Hell. Summoning supernatural powers from Satan and targeting the people she deems responsible for her demise, she sets out on a quest for revenge.

== Cast ==
- Rocio Scotto as Zara Pereira
- Jason Faunt as Robert Pereira
- James Hyde as Jeffrey Delap
- Andrew Lauer as Officer Gerrard
- Raj Jawa as Derek Patel
- Kylie Rohrer as Maya Valentina

== Production ==
Principal photography began in Los Angeles in October 2023. In August 2024, the first teaser trailer was released.

Elezeid composed the original soundtrack for the film, which marks the ten year anniversary of working with Andrew de Burgh from when they first collaborated on the psychological thriller short film Just One Drink.

== Reception ==
On Rotten Tomatoes, the film has an approval rating of 40%, based on 5 reviews. In his review of the film, Film Threat critic Terry Sherwood gave it a 7 out of 10 and said, it "treads the domestic horror/revenge territory of Takashi Miike's Audition and added that it's "quirky enough to fit next to the more extreme Asian and European offerings”. Nerdly critic Phil Wheat gave it a 4 out of 5, calling it "an interesting twist on the genre that manages to leave the viewer feeling rather disturbed and uneasy despite occasionally stumbling over itself”. Douglas Davidson of Elements of Madness gave it a 2.5 out of 5, stating that "while it's rich in ideas and atmosphere, the end result doesn’t feel like the justified rage of Medea upon an Argonaut, but a surface-level depiction of various tropes gathered together to excuse the bloodletting."
