= Theodore C. Panos =

American pediatrician and researcher

- Theodore C. Panos, c. 1960s
- Born: July 10, 1915; St. Louis, Missouri, U.S.
- Died: April 15, 1970; Las Vegas, Nevada, U.S.
- Occupations: Pediatrician, medical researcher

Theodore Constantine Panos (July 10, 1915 – April 15, 1970) was an American pediatrician and medical researcher. He served as professor and chairman of the Department of Pediatrics at the University of Arkansas School of Medicine from 1958 until his death in 1970. His research included pediatric nutrition, the endocrine and metabolic effects of dietary fat deficiency, and clinical studies of growth and bone-age retardation in children with cystic fibrosis. He also collaborated in Arkansas clinical trials of an experimental live attenuated rubella vaccine. His research was later cited and discussed in medical and historical literature, including a World Health Organization monograph on poliomyelitis, the “Nutrition Classics” section of Nutrition Reviews, and later scholarship on pediatric research and the Arkansas rubella trials.

== Biography ==
Panos was born on July 10, 1915, in St. Louis, Missouri. He earned a bachelor's degree from the State University of Iowa in 1938 and an M.D. from the same institution in 1942.

He later entered pediatric residency at the University of Minnesota. Panos and pediatrician Clifford G. Grulee subsequently reported a clinical study of 464 patients admitted to the pediatric service of the University of Minnesota Hospitals during the 1946 poliomyelitis epidemic. A University of Minnesota staff bulletin dated October 3, 1947, reported that Panos had left to become an instructor of pediatrics at the University of Texas.

University of Texas Board of Regents records list Panos as an associate professor of pediatrics at the Medical Branch in Galveston in 1953 and as a professor of pediatrics there by 1956. The Board of Regents subsequently recorded his resignation as professor of pediatrics, effective February 15, 1958.

In 1958, Panos joined the University of Arkansas School of Medicine in Little Rock as professor and chairman of the Department of Pediatrics.

Panos remained chair of the department until his death on April 15, 1970, in Las Vegas.

== Academic work ==
Panos's research included pediatric nutrition, the endocrine and metabolic effects of dietary fat deficiency, and growth and bone-age retardation in children with cystic fibrosis.

In a 1951 study in The New England Journal of Medicine, Fletcher H. McDowell and Fred Plum noted that Grulee and Panos had found transient hypertension in 51 of 70 patients with poliomyelitis. In the 1955 World Health Organization monograph Poliomyelitis, Robert Debré and Stéphane Thieffry cited statistics compiled by Grulee and Panos during the Minnesota epidemic when discussing the frequency of clinical symptoms.

In 1955, Panos coauthored a study of the threonine requirements of normal infants, which was included in the “Nutrition Classics” section of Nutrition Reviews in 1977.

Panos's research on dietary fat deficiency included experimental studies of endocrine and metabolic effects in rats published in The Journal of Nutrition and Proceedings of the Society for Experimental Biology and Medicine.

In the 1961 third edition of Sex and Internal Secretions, James H. Leathem discussed findings from several studies by Panos and his collaborators when reviewing the effects of fat-deficient diets on pituitary-cell changes, testicular degeneration, and reproductive function in rats.

Panos later reviewed the endocrine effects of dietary fat deficiency in a 1963 article in The Journal of Pediatrics.

Panos's clinical research was also examined in later historical scholarship on pediatric research ethics. In Children and Drug Safety (2018), historian Cynthia A. Connolly discussed Panos as the lead physician on the 1963 study Control of Water Balance in the Newborn and described an exchange in which pediatrician Evan Charney raised ethical concerns with journal editor A. Ashley Weech, who subsequently corresponded with Panos about the study.

In 1965, Panos collaborated with National Institutes of Health investigators Harry M. Meyer Jr. and Paul D. Parkman in clinical trials of an experimental live attenuated rubella vaccine at the Arkansas Children's Colony in Conway, Arkansas. Contemporary coverage in JAMA reported Panos's announcement of the first clinical trials of the experimental vaccine. Meyer, Parkman, and Panos subsequently reported the clinical trial in The New England Journal of Medicine in September 1966.

In 2001, the Historical Archives Advisory Committee of the American Academy of Pediatrics included the 1966 live attenuated rubella vaccine among its milestones in American pediatrics and named Meyer, Parkman, and Panos in the entry. In Dangerous Pregnancies (2010), historian Leslie J. Reagan discussed the Arkansas Children's Colony trials and reported Panos's statement that the project had been designed and conducted with fully informed parental consent.

== Selected publications ==
- Grulee CG Jr, Panos TC. Epidemic Poliomyelitis in Children: Clinical Study, with Special Reference to Symptoms and Management of Bulbar Polioencephalitis. American Journal of Diseases of Children. 1948;75(1):24–39.
- Panos TC, Finerty JC. Effects of a Fat-Free Diet on Growing Female Rats, with Special Reference to the Endocrine System. The Journal of Nutrition. 1953;49(3):397–423.
- Pratt EL, Snyderman SE, Cheung MW, Norton P, Holt LE Jr, Hansen AE, Panos TC. The Threonine Requirement of the Normal Infant. The Journal of Nutrition. 1955;56(2):231–251.
- Dennis JL, Panos TC. Growth and Bone-Age Retardation in Cystic Fibrosis: Response to an Anabolic Steroid. JAMA. 1965;194(8):855–858.
- Meyer HM Jr, Parkman PD, Panos TC. Attenuated Rubella Virus: Production of an Experimental Live-Virus Vaccine and Clinical Trial. The New England Journal of Medicine. 1966;275(11):575–580.

== Academic leadership and professional service ==
University of Texas Board of Regents records show that in 1953 Panos traveled to Atlantic City to attend a meeting of the Society for Pediatric Research and present a paper.

According to a history published by the University of Arkansas for Medical Sciences, the pediatric faculty grew to 17 members during Panos's tenure as chair, providing coverage in all pediatric specialties represented at the time. Pediatric endocrinologist Delbert A. Fisher later recalled that Panos recruited him to the University of Arkansas in 1960 as part of an effort to develop a pediatric research program.

From February 11 to 13, 1963, Panos directed an American Academy of Pediatrics postgraduate course on “Growth Disturbances” at the Arkansas Medical Center, with invited faculty including L. Emmett Holt Jr., Lawson Wilkins, James N. Etteldorf, and Robert A. Ulstrom.

The UAMS history states that Panos selected Joycelyn Elders as the department's first African American pediatric resident. The University of Arkansas's Pryor Center for Arkansas Oral and Visual History identifies Panos as the physician who hired Elders as chief resident at the University of Arkansas Medical Center. A 1989 profile reproduced in the Congressional Record described Panos as a major influence on Elders's life and career.

Panos served as an official examiner for the American Board of Pediatrics.
