= Wade in the Water (film) =

2019 film by Mark Wilson

- Directed by: Mark Wilson
- Screenplay by: Chris Retts
- Produced by: Chris Retts; Mark Wilson
- Starring: Tom E. Nicholson; Danika Golombek
- Cinematography: Thomas Rose
- Edited by: Mark Wilson
- Music by: Jacob Boyd
- Distributed by: Indie Rights
- Release dates: February 16, 2019 (Hollywood Reel Independent Film Festival); August 21, 2020 (Streaming)
- Running time: 88 minutes
- Country: United States
- Language: English

Wade in the Water is a 2019 American drama film directed by Mark Wilson, his directorial debut, written by Chris Retts, and starring Tom E. Nicholson and Danika Golombek. The plot revolves around a man whose solitary life is interrupted when he receives a neighbor's package bearing a horrifying secret.

== Plot ==
Sure, our man has a name, but he never gives it. He works from home. His neighbors are all idiots. He doesn't really "do" friends. But all that changes when a mis-delivered package arrives in his post office box bearing a horrifying secret—one that will set him on a collision course with a predator, the man's disillusioned daughter, and his own dark past.

== Cast ==
- Tom E. Nicholson as Our Man
- Danika Golombek as Tilly Anderton
- Samuel Whitehill as William Anderton
- John Clark as Our Man's Father
- Kevin McKim as Paul Guisek
- Jeremiah Jahi as Police Officer
- Elisabeth Granli as Elizabeth Anderton
- Jacob Boyd as Mailbox Clerk
- Sheila Mears as Therapist
- Jason Sutton as Gun Salesman
- Zachary Cowan as Timothy Guisek
- Matthew Daniger as Chef Burger Owner
- Laura Grimaldi as Debbie Guisek
- Robin Boyd as News Radio Reporter 1
- Paul Chung as Uber Driver

== Reception ==
Stephen King praised the movie on his Twitter account saying;

"WADE IN THE WATER (Amazon Prime): No big FX, no expensive sets, but two pretty exceptional performances. It's a little movie with a big heart." - Stephen King
