= Nicholas Tana =

American film director

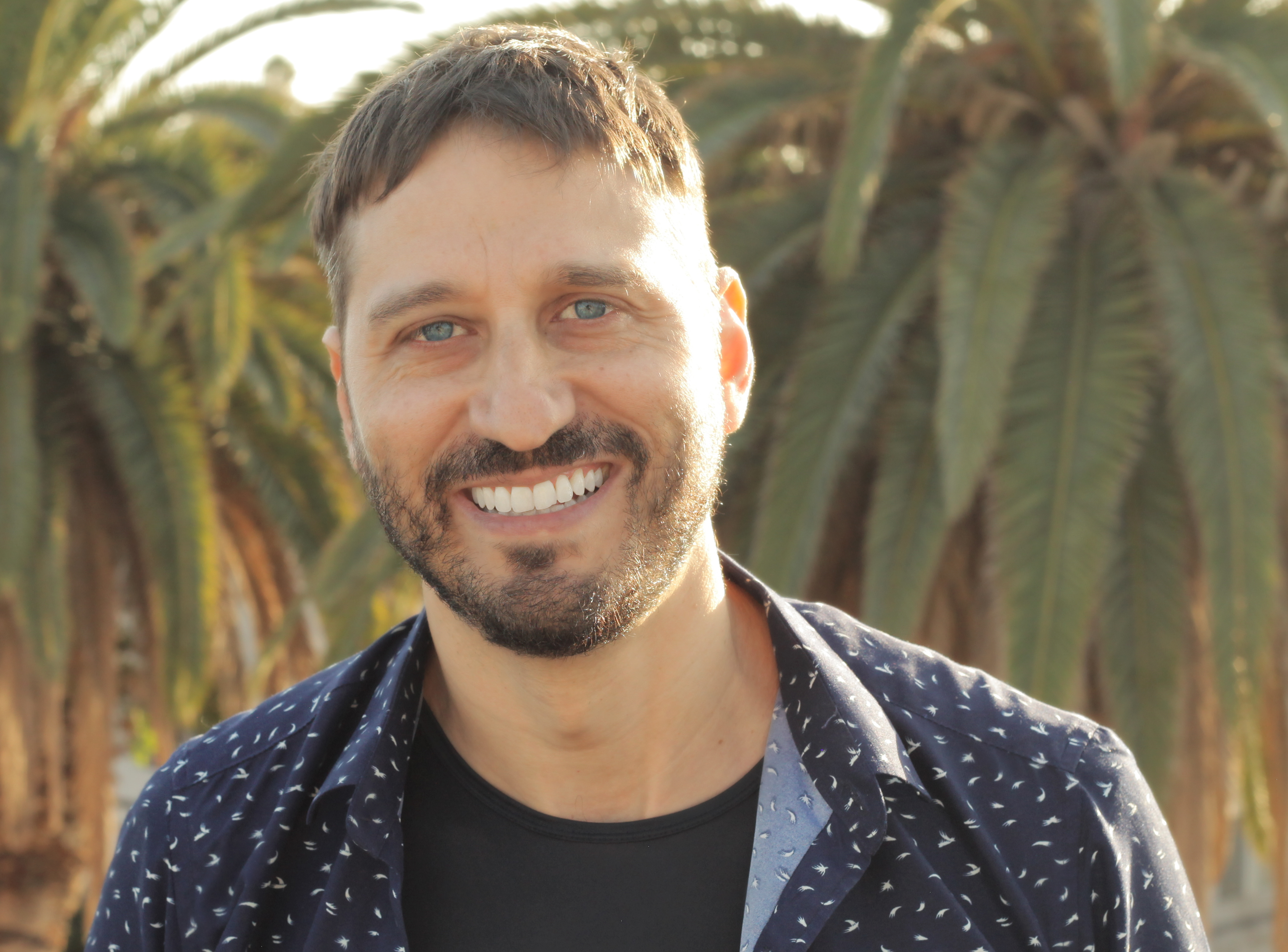
- Occupations: Writer, director, actor, and musician
- Known for: Hell's Kitty
- Website: www.nicholastana.com

Nicholas Tana is a writer, director, actor, and musician best known for the Hell's Kitty movie and web-series.

== Life and career ==
Before starting his own production company, Tana worked at ESPN as an associate director in the international department.

He has received much critical attention from the horror community for his Hell's Kitty TV series. It features a host of horror icons often portrayed in parodies of the roles for which they are famous, including Adrienne Barbeau, Doug Jones, Michael Berryman, Courtney Gains, Lee Meriwether, John Franklin, Lynn Lowry, Bill Oberst Jr., Ashley C. Williams, Barbara Nedeljakova, and Dale Midkiff. Tana himself also stars in Hell's Kitty, alongside his real cat Angel, and the series is based on his experiences.

Tana is also the writer, director, and producer of the sex-positive documentary Sticky: A (Self) Love Story The film is an exploration of the cultural taboos and pervasive stigma surrounding masturbation, drawing on Tana's nine years of research into the social and psychological aspects of the activity.

He is the founder of Smart Media LLC, a production company, and New Classics Books, a publishing agency.

== Awards and recognition ==
Tana's work has received recognition in several screenwriting competitions. His film Hillbillies vs. Alien Chickens won the Horror2Comics/Script2Comic Award in 2022, and placed as a semifinalist in the Scriptapalooza 2024 Screenplay Competition. His screenplay Fire the Surgeon General was also a Scriptapalooza finalist.

Tana wrote The Little Lion That Listened, which received an Independent Press Award for Best Audiobook in 2023. His books Monsters Are Afraid of Babies and The Little Lion That Listened have been reviewed by Publishers Weekly and Kirkus Reviews. He also wrote The Wishing Well, published by Disney Publishing Worldwide.

His documentary Sticky: A (Self) Love Story was selected as an Amazon Video Direct Stars winner in July 2016.

The musical version of Hell's Kitty has won the following awards:

- 2018: American Tracks Music Award, Category "Best song for a film"
- 2019: American Tracks Music Award, Category "Best film score" (semi-finalist)
- 2019: Paris Art and Movie Awards, Category "Best Soundtrack" (nomination)

== Music and composition ==
Tana is a songwriter with over twenty published songs. He co-wrote the pop song "Chainsaw Kitty" with composer Richard Albert, which was featured on the Hell's Kitty soundtrack and was an American Tracks award winner. The music video features a host of well-known horror icons who also appear in the Hell's Kitty web-series and feature film.

A musical version of Hell's Kitty, based on the film and web-series, was written by Nicholas Tana and produced by Smart Media L.L.C. and New Musicals Inc. It was performed at the Broadwater Theater as part of the Hollywood Fringe Festival 2019. The original songs for the musical were largely written and composed by Tana, Alexa Borden, and Richard Albert.

== Discography ==
Up to December 2025, Tana has released the following albums and singles.

=== Albums ===
Album
Release date	Album	No. of tracks	Genre	Label
2012	Essential Vibe Collection, Volume 1	23		
2018	Hell's Kitty	25		

=== Singles and EPs ===
Singles and EPs
Year	Song	Notes
2024	"Soul Below"	
2024	"Suicidal Baby"	
2023	"Multicolored Spiked Umbrella"	
2023	"Ebb and Flow "	
2023	"See the Light"	
2022	Hope Punk	EP
2022	"Christmas Tree"	
2022	"Senor Pedro"	
2022	"Galactic Girl"	
2022	"Solo Song"	
2022	"Better Times"	
2022	"Gonna Kiss You"	
2022	"Rainbow Baby"	
2018	"Chainsaw Kitty"	

== Filmography ==
Year	Title	Credited as				Notes
Year	Title	Director	Writer	Producer	Actor	Notes
2018	Hell's Kitty	Yes	Yes	Yes	Yes	
2016	Sticky: A (Self) Love Story	Yes	Yes	Yes	No	Documentary
2011–2015	Hell's Kitty (TV series)	Yes	Yes	Yes	Yes	
	The Director	Yes	Yes	Yes	No	

== Books ==
Tana has written a number of books, including the following:

- eJunky
- Hell's Kitty
- The Kitten, the Cat & the Apple
- The Kingdom of Glee
- Monsters Are Afraid of Babies
- The Little Lion That Listened
- Lost Angel in Los Angeles
