= Hell's Kitty =

- Directed by: Nicholas Tana
- Written by: Nicholas Tana
- Produced by: Nicholas Tana; Denise Acosta
- Starring: Doug Jones; Dale Midkiff; Adrienne Barbeau; Lee Meriwether; Michael Berryman; Courtney Gains; John Franklin; Lynn Lowry; Kelli Maroney; Ashley C. Williams; Barbara Nedeljakova; Bill Oberst Jr.
- Music by: Richard Albert
- Release date: March 27, 2018
- Running time: 98 minutes
- Country: United States
- Language: English

Hell's Kitty is a 2018 American comedy horror film based on a web series and a comic book of the same name, which aired during 2011–2015. The web series is said to be based on the real-life experiences of the writer and director, Nicholas Tana, living with his strange cat, Angel.

The musical version of Hell's Kitty made its musical theater debut at the Hollywood Fringe Festival in June 2019. The musical features the American Tracks award-winning song Chainsaw Kitty.

== Plot ==
Nick, a Hollywood writer, and Angel, his possessed and very possessive cat, live together. Angel behaves possessively of his owner around women, which results in comical yet horrific situations.

== Cast ==
- Nicholas Tana as Nick
- Doug Jones as Father Damien
- Dale Midkiff as Rosemary Carrie
- Adrienne Barbeau as Mrs. Carrie
- Lee Meriwether as Grandma Kyle
- Michael Berryman as Detective Pluto
- Courtney Gains as Mordicia
- John Franklin as Isaiah
- Lynn Lowry as The Medium
- Kelli Maroney as Esmerelda
- Ashley C. Williams as Lyndsay
- Barbara Nedeljakova as Natalya
- Bill Oberst Jr. as Father Blatty
