= Richard Albert =

Richard Albert may refer to:

- Richard Albert (composer) (born 1983), German composer and songwriter
- Richard Albert (field hockey) (born 1963), Canadian former field hockey player
- Richard Albert (professor) (born 1977), Canadian legal scholar
