= Jeffrey M. Werner =

American film editor

- Born: United States
- Occupation: Film editor
- Years active: 1999 - present

Jeffrey Michael Werner, ACE is an American film editor. He is best known as the editor of such films as Right at Your Door, 2 Days in Paris, Religulous, and The Kids Are All Right. Werner co-edited the 2010 film Peacock with the late Sally Menke, as well as being an additional editor of Eternal Sunshine of the Spotless Mind. Television work includes NBC's show Community, HBO's Ballers and Olive Kitteridge.

Werner attended the University of Oregon and completed a dual major in Philosophy and English Literature. Werner was nominated for the 2011 ACE Eddie Award for Best Edited Feature Film (Comedy or Musical) for The Kids Are All Right. He was also nominated for the 2014 ACE Eddie Award and won an Emmy for his work on Olive Kitteridge.

== Filmography ==
Year	Film	Director	Other notes
2001	Heist	David Mamet	assistant editor
2002	Gangs of New York	Martin Scorsese	assistant editor
2004	Eternal Sunshine of the Spotless Mind	Michel Gondry	with Valdis Oskarsdottir
2008	Sleep Dealer	Alex Rivera	
2008	Religulous	Larry Charles	
2010	Peacock	Michael Lander	with Sally Menke
2010	The Kids Are All Right	Lisa Cholodenko	
2011	Prom	Joe Nussbaum	
2011	The Oranges	Julian Farino	with Carol Cravetz
2015	Hidden	Matt Duffer; Ross Duffer	
2017	Ideal Home	Andrew Fleming	
2017	Professor Marston and the Wonder Women	Angela Robinson	
2022	Father Stu	Rosalind Ross	
2025	Jingle Bell Heist	Michael Fimognari	
