= The Legend of Santa =

2021 film by Andrew de Burgh

- Directed by: Andrew de Burgh
- Written by: Daniel Colyer
- Based on: A Magical Christmas Adventure by Daniel Colyer
- Produced by: Daniel Colyer; Laurie Ashbourne; Andrew de Burgh
- Music by: Marc Timón
- Production companies: AMCA Productions; TheTreeFort Animations
- Distributed by: Mbur Films
- Release dates: August 7, 2021 (Dokufest); December 25, 2021
- Running time: 6 minutes
- Country: United Kingdom
- Language: English

The Legend of Santa is a 2021 British animated fantasy short film written by Daniel Colyer and directed by Andrew de Burgh. Based on the Christmas novel A Magical Christmas Adventure by Colyer and combining both historical and fantasy elements, it tells an origin story of Santa Claus.

It premiered at the BAFTA qualifying film festival Dokufest on 7 August 2021, and was released by Mbur Films on the iOS app Sofy.tv on 25 December 2021.

== Plot ==
When Saint Nicholas, a compassionate bishop, sees that his woodcarving hobby has the ability to brighten a poor girl's life, he sets out on a journey to see that children everywhere have the same opportunity.

== Release ==
On 6 November 2020 the official trailer was released.

The film had its World Premiere at Dokufest in August 2021 and was released on 25 December 2021 by Mbur Films on the iOS short film app Sofy TV.

== Reception ==
The movie received positive reviews from critics. In his review of the movie, Film Threat critic Bobby LePire said of it, "the film's world is inviting and feels truly magical". Anton Bitel of Projected Figures, called it "sweet and sentimental." UK Film Review critic Jason Knight gave it 5 stars out of 5, stating "This remarkable achievement offers six unforgettable minutes. Everybody who collaborated in the making of this deserves great praise. Thanks to their hard work, they brought to the world a moving story, filled with marvelous animation and an outstanding score." GhMovieFreak Tony Asankomah gave it 3 stars out of 5, stating "it has the makings of a feature-length animation film, that could at least capture how the acts of kindness of one man possibly change the lives of many."
