= EJunky =

2023 graphic novel

eJunky
- Author: Nicholas Tana
- Cover artist: Darick Robertson, Daniele Serra and Stefano Cardoselli.
- Language: English
- Genre: Science fiction
- Publication date: 2023
- Publication place: US
- Pages: 268
- ISBN: 1-950-03317-1

eJunky is a 2023 science fiction noir graphic novel by American author Nicholas Tana, with artwork by Kyle Faehnrich. It is published by Scout Comic and collected in a trade paperback edition distributed by Simon & Schuster.

== Synopsis ==
Set in a dystopian 2055, eJunky portrays a world where advanced neural and emotional-regulation technologies — nerve-reading devices (N.R.D.s) and “Emo-Regs” have rendered pain and suffering virtually obsolete and controlled.

In this society, a clandestine group of addicts known as “eJunkies” seek unfiltered experience including pain by using a forbidden memory-drug called “Torch,” which allows users to relive other people’s memories, including traumatic ones.

The novel follows Hector Holmes, a disgraced former investigator turned eJunky, who after a near-fatal overdose of Torch is recruited by a task force from the global corporate authority (the “World Corporation Organization,” W.C.O.) to infiltrate and stop a cult-like group called The Guardians of Pain the black-market distributors of Torch.

As Hector dives deeper into the underworld of illicit memories, he enlists the help of a “dream celebrity” named Astra. Together, they navigate a stark divide between sanitized reality and raw human experience a journey that questions the price of erasing pain, the value of memory, and the nature of humanity itself.

== Reception ==
Upon release, eJunky received coverage and interviews in genre-focused media. In an interview with a comics-oriented outlet, the novel was described as a “multi-layered slice of sci-fi noir,” combining familiar cyberpunk/dystopian tropes with a distinctive, morally ambiguous detective story.

Reviewers highlighted Faehnrich’s art style and atmospheric world-building as particular strengths, noting that the visual aesthetic reinforces the dark, immersive tone of the narrative.

At the same time, criticism has emerged regarding the density of the story's world-building and the complexity of its speculative concepts, which certain readers find challenging to fully absorb.

== Publication history ==
eJunky debuted in 2023 as part of Scout Comics' Nonstop line, initially released in single-issue format with variant covers by acclaimed artists Daniele Serra and Stefano Cardoselli.

The series was later collected into a trade paperback edition distributed by Simon & Schuster. This first edition featured cover art by Darick Robertson,. The title was promoted with panels and signings at major industry conventions throughout 2023
