= Contract Killers =

- Theatrical release poster
- Directed by: Justin B. Rhodes
- Written by: Ric Moxley; Justin B. Rhodes
- Produced by: G. Anthony Joseph
- Starring: Frida Farrell; Nick Mancuso; Rhett Giles; Brewier Welch; Wolf Muser; Paul Cram
- Cinematography: Andre Lascaris
- Edited by: Justin B. Rhodes
- Music by: Michael Mouracade
- Production company: Birch Tree Productions
- Distributed by: Birch Tree Entertainment
- Release date: July 2008 (Action On Film Festival)
- Running time: 90 minutes
- Country: United States
- Language: English

Contract Killers is a 2008 action film about a female assassin on the run from the law. The film was directed by Justin B. Rhodes, and stars Frida Farrell, Nick Mancuso, and Rhett Giles with an appearance by Paul Cram.

== Plot ==
A CIA assassin tries to escape the contract killing business, but when 'the system' tracks her down and frames her for murder, she embarks on a parth of revenge.

== Cast ==
- Frida Farrell as "Jane"
- Nick Mancuso as "Witkoff"
- Steve Boergadine as "Winston Scott"
- Paul Cram as "Chuck Dittmer"
- Rhett Giles as "Purnell"
- G. Anthony Joseph as "Monoven"
- Wolf Muser as "Targonsky"
- Christian Willis as "Lars"

== Reception ==
Brent Simon, writing for Shared Darkness said, "There's no cool, breezy Mr. & Mrs. Smith-type snappishness here, and the film isn't briskly shot or slickly constructed enough to stack up with any of the Bourne films, a wayward spy series that it clearly wants to emulate."
