= Peacock (2010 film) =

2010 film by Michael Lander

- Directed by: Michael Lander
- Written by: Michael Lander; Ryan Roy
- Produced by: Barry Mendel
- Starring: Cillian Murphy; Elliot Page (Note: Credited as Ellen Page; Page came out as transgender and changed his name in 2020.); Susan Sarandon; Josh Lucas; Bill Pullman; Keith Carradine; Flynn Milligan
- Cinematography: Philippe Rousselot
- Edited by: Sally Menke; Jeffrey M. Werner
- Music by: Brian Reitzell
- Production company: Mandate Pictures
- Distributed by: Lionsgate Home Entertainment
- Release date: April 20, 2010
- Running time: 91 minutes
- Country: United States
- Language: English

Peacock is a 2010 American psychological thriller directed by Michael Lander, written by Lander and Ryan Roy, and starring Cillian Murphy, Elliot Page and Susan Sarandon. The film was released direct-to-DVD on April 20, 2010, by Lionsgate Home Entertainment.

== Plot ==
In the mid-1960's, John Skillpa (Cillian Murphy), a quiet bank clerk living alone in tiny Peacock, Nebraska, prefers to live an invisible life in order to hide his secret: He has dissociative identity disorder, the implied result of childhood trauma inflicted by his abusive mother. His other identity is a woman, Emma, who each morning does his chores and cooks him breakfast before he starts the day. One day while he is using the outside yard clothesline as Emma, a freight train caboose derails and crashes into John's backyard. When his neighbors come to the scene, Emma enters his house, putting John's other life into the spotlight, so he is forced to tell his neighbors that Emma is his wife, married in secrecy. Forced to fool the town into believing John and Emma are husband and wife, they must maintain their secret while in public view.

The town mayor, Ray Crill (Keith Carradine), and his wife Fanny (Susan Sarandon) come to see John try to host a political rally in his backyard in support of the incumbent candidate for the federal elections for senator. John is unwilling to do so, but Emma agrees. Fanny runs a women's shelter in the small town of 800, and convinces Emma to hold the rally in order to raise funds for her organization. She agrees, but the next day, John has a mental breakdown at work when he meets the Crills. John is afraid, under the mayor's stipulation, that the two be present for the ceremony, presenting obvious problems that would reveal his identity. He phones the railway company to have it removed immediately, in order to avoid the confrontation.

One night, a young mother, Maggie (Elliot Page) appears at John's house, looking for him. She has been receiving checks from John's mother, who died a year ago, to support her and her two-year-old son. She wants to move out of the town with her son Jake (Flynn Milligan) in order to seek new opportunities, but is unable to procure the funds to do so. She comes to John's house to ask for money, but he just goes upstairs and becomes Emma. Not knowing Emma, Maggie feels bad, and Emma drives her home, to her trailer. There, it is revealed that Jake is, in fact, Jake Skillpa, the son of John and Maggie. Emma suggests that Maggie move into Fanny's women shelter, but she refuses, citing that the women there are "unambitious."

John then visits Maggie at the shelter, agreeing to give her a ride to Madison, as well as just over $1000, his savings at the bank. Emma offers Maggie a job at the bank, in an attempt to keep Maggie in Peacock. John asks Maggie to meet him at the local motel at 11pm that night to collect the money. Emma seduces a man at the bar that night, and leads him to the motel room that John had arranged. She beats the man unconscious, lays him on the bed, and sets the motel on fire as Maggie comes to meet John. Emma, long gone, gets to feign the death of her "husband."

When the rally takes place, Emma shuts herself in her home, ignoring the attendees. She gives the money to Maggie, telling her to leave because it is not safe here in Peacock, as well as trying to prevent the abuse that she herself had endured. The film ends with Maggie holding Jake over her shoulder as they walk down the porch steps, with Jake waving a childhood toy of John's that Emma had given him and Emma barring herself in her home.

== Cast ==
- Cillian Murphy as John / Emma Skillpa, a "retiring, shy and completely nondescript bank employee" leading a double life as Emma, his female dissociative identity. Murphy stated that "Peacock stunned me as a script from start to finish. It offers an incredible challenge to an actor — one I couldn't turn down."
- Elliot Page as Maggie Bailey, a struggling young mother who holds the key to John's past and sparks a battle between the personalities. Page commented, "This is one of the boldest screenplays I've come across in my albeit short career; it's a character and story I can throw myself into and exactly the type of movie I love to be a part of."
- Flynn Milligan as Jake, the son of Maggie and John. This was Milligan's first feature film.
- Susan Sarandon as Fanny Crill, the wife of Peacock's mayor, who also runs a local woman's shelter. Sarandon has said that Peacock is "a very strange little piece — kind of ominous."
- Bill Pullman as Edmund French, John's boss. Pullman has described Peacock as "a very interesting script," explaining that his role "is another character hiding the fact he's the closest one like [Skillpa]. It's a very different part for me."
- Josh Lucas as Tom McGonigle, a local police officer and the closest thing John has to a friend.
- Keith Carradine as Mayor Ray Crill
- Paul Cram as Kenny, a local store clerk.

Casting calls for extras and other minor roles were made in the Des Moines, Iowa area in April 2008.

== Production and filming ==
Set in small-town Nebraska, Peacock was filmed in the neighboring state of Iowa: Filming began on May 6, 2008, in Odebolt, in Sac County, while Greenfield and Adair County also staged production for several days, including scenes in Greenfield's town square and its E.E. Warren Opera House. Filming was scheduled to continue on June 5, 2008, in Boone, Iowa, but due to weather conditions, Cornfield Productions was forced to delay filming until the following day; the filming ended on June 9.

The filming of the train derailment scene occurred at a local set of train tracks; line producer Brian Bell explained that this particular shot was a "visual effects" shot, where the train would eventually be digitally edited to appear as if it is passing through Skillpa's backyard, even though it is not physically there. Although the shooting took four hours to complete, it only comprises about 10 to 15 seconds of the film.

Filming also took place in Weldon, Iowa at a local cafe called Wade’s Cafe.

== Release ==
The film was released direct-to-DVD on April 20, 2010, by Lionsgate Home Entertainment.
