= Indie Rights =

American film production and distribution company

Indie Rights, Inc.
- Industry: Film
- Founded: 2007; 19 years ago
- Headquarters: 825 S Hill Street, #604; Los Angeles, California; United States
- Key people: Linda Nelson (CEO); Michael Madison (COO)
- Products: Motion pictures
- Parent: Nelson Madison Films (est. 2003)
- Website: indierights.com

Indie Rights, Inc. is an American distributor of independent films, based in Los Angeles, California. Indie Rights is a subsidiary of Nelson Madison Films and was incorporated in 2007 to act as distributor for other independent filmmakers. The corporation began as a private MySpace group where the makers of independent films could get information about the changing face of film distribution; founders Linda Nelson and Michael Madison created Indie Rights so that distribution contracts could be signed by a legal entity. The corporation distributes films largely through video on demand services, though more recently it has overseen such theatrical releases as We Are Kings and Fray, both in 2014.

Nelson Madison Films has produced three features: Bigger Than Live (2002), Shifted (2006) and Delivered (2011).

== History ==
=== Background ===
Linda Nelson is a former investment banker and computer systems analyst based in Los Angeles since 1980; Michael Madison moved there in 1999 from Duncanville, Texas, to work as an actor and film producer. They first partnered in 2000 to create and distribute the NSYNC concert film Bigger Than Live for IMAX theaters. In 2003, they formed their own company with the goal of making independent features using local talent. Madison acts and handles writing, producing and directing duties; Nelson writes and produces while developing distribution plans for other filmmakers.

=== Lawsuit and recovery ===
Bigger Than Live broke even during its theatrical run, but Nelson and Madison "failed to tie up the necessary rights in our initial contract" and lost home video distribution in a lawsuit that shut down their production office. They moved into "more humble digs" and tried again with the crime thriller Shifted, learning the ins and outs of distribution while attending film festivals. Nelson soon discovered that the chances of getting a film seen at a major festival such as Sundance or Cannes without having connections in the industry "are slim to nothing." The company began a private group on MySpace called Indie Co-op, where filmmakers could get details on self-distribution, including attendance at smaller festivals where films are likely to benefit from local coverage and reviews.

Nelson believed that film distributors didn't have any systems for accountability in place, and that they tended to buy the rights to entire catalogs rather than individual films, so she and Madison decided to do it themselves. Since they needed a legal entity to make distribution contracts valid, they incorporated Indie Rights in 2007. Nelson said doing both film production and distribution gives them a greater understanding of the challenges that filmmakers face than would a company that focuses only on distribution.

=== Film distribution ===
Indie Rights distributes globally to on demand platforms such as Amazon Video, Google Play, Hulu and iTunes, where filmmakers can earn up to 80 percent of the revenue. Innovations include searchable film rentals on YouTube and through video game consoles. In 2014, the company was the first independent studio included on M–GO, a subscription service supported by six major studios that offers films for home viewing while they are playing in theaters.

Filmmaker and Baylor University professor Christopher Hansen turned to Indie Rights in 2015 when his film Where We Started failed to make the major festival circuit. After a short run at the Arena Cinema Hollywood led to favorable reviews, the film was released via digital platforms. Theatrical releases by Indie Rights also include 9 Full Moons (2013), featuring Amy Seimetz and Harry Dean Stanton; We Are Kings, the feature-film debut of America's Got Talent winner Bianca Ryan, Move Me No Mountain (2023), and Druid Peak, starring Spencer Treat Clark and winner of Best Feature Film at the 2014 Omaha Film Festival.

Indie Rights became part of the Independent Online Distribution Alliance in 2008, and is a member of the Independent Film & Television Alliance, which presents the American Film Market each year in November. Nelson and Madison also conduct seminars for independent filmmakers looking to build an audience through social networking. In 2016, Indie Rights launched its own subscription channel available through services including Roku.

=== Filmmaking ===
Starting in 2010, the budgetary constraints of independent film-making required that Nelson Madison Films go tapeless. Delivered, their second "crime thriller", was their first to utilize Red Digital Cinema cameras and Adobe CS5 production software. Madison directed, and played the lead role in an "uneven performance" where "at times he's spot-on".

== Films ==
By early 2018, Indie Rights had distributed a catalog of more than 450 films. The list includes:

- Unconformity (2022)
- Bluff (2022)
- Active Shooter (2020), Robert Bryce Milburn's feature film debut starring Joshua Mikel from The Walking Dead and Catherine Dyer from Stranger Things.
- American Songwriter, Michael Altman 's award-winning 2012 documentary that spawned a sequel
- Butterfly Crush, the 2010 Australian film that won multiple Best Feature awards on the U.S. independent film circuit
- Capps Crossing, a 2017 slasher horror film
- Carving a Life, a 2017 romance drama about the effects of alcoholism.
- char-ac-ter (2009), a documentary about "the life and craft of acting" featuring Dabney Coleman, Peter Falk and Charles Grodin
- Delivered, winner for Best Supporting Actress (Alana Stewart) and of the Special Jury Award (Action/Adventure) at the 44th WorldFest-Houston International Film Festival
- Dreams on Spec, a 2007 documentary featuring interviews with James L. Brooks, Nora Ephron and Carrie Fisher
- Ekaj (2015)
- Entwinement (2013), multiple award nominee at the Madrid International Film Festival and London Portobello Film Festival
- Flesh On Fire: Addicted to a Dream, winner of the 2014 LA Film, TV & Webisode Festival Audience Award for best documentary
- Fools On the Hill, a 2012 political documentary featuring Ed Begley Jr. and Dean Cain
- Fray, 2012 Best Feature Film winner at both the UK Film Festival and the Arizona International Film Festival
- Love All You Have Left, a 2017 drama about Anne Frank living in the attic of a grieving family.
- OzLand, a 2014 fantasy/sci-fi drama inspired by L. Frank Baum's The Wonderful Wizard of Oz
- The Playground, a 2017 thriller about five individuals intertwined in a fable orchestrated by a dark entity.
- Purdah (film), a 2018 documentary by Jeremy Guy that is 100% Fresh on Rotten Tomatoes
- Sincerely, Brenda, the 2018 film by Kenneth Nelson Jr. that won multiple Best Feature awards on the U.S. independent film circuit
- Shifted (2006), the company's first production, featuring Jeris Poindexter, Jill Wagner and Vanessa Johansson
- Skid Row, a 2008 documentary starring Pras (credited as Pras Michel) of Fugees
- The Story of Lovers Rock (2012) featuring Maxi Priest
- Tovarisch, I Am Not Dead, a documentary by Stuart Urban first screened in theaters in 2007
- Transatlantic Coffee, winner of seven awards (including First Place [feature film] and Best Directing) at the Spring 2012 Los Angeles New Wave International Film Festival
- We Make Movies, a 2017 comedic mockumentary about a group of college students making a movie for their town's Film Festival.
- The Bestowal (2019), a sci-fi drama from filmmaker Andrew de Burgh.
- The Forgiving (2020), a drama centered around a despondent writer finding his salvation through the ghosts of his past.
- Goodbye, Petrushka (2022), a comedy about an American girl who goes to Paris.

== See also ==
- Film distribution
