= Monarca =

2019 Spanish-language television series

- Genre: Drama
- Created by: Diego Gutiérrez
- Written by: Sandra García Velten; Ana Sofía Clerici; Fernando Rovzar; Julia Denis
- Starring: Irene Azuela; Juan Manuel Bernal; Osvaldo Benavides; Rosa María Bianchi
- Country of origin: Mexico
- Original language: Spanish
- No. of seasons: 2
- No. of episodes: 18

Production
- Executive producer: Diego Gutiérrez
- Production companies: Ventanarosa; Lemon Studios; Stearns Castle

Original release
- Release: 13 September 2019 – 1 January 2021

Monarca is a Mexican drama television series created and produced by Diego Gutiérrez. It stars Osvaldo Benavides, Juan Manuel Bernal, Rosa María Bianchi, and Irene Azuela. The plot revolves around a billionaire tequila magnate and his family in the corrupt world of Mexico's business elites riddled with scandal and violence. The series was released on September 13, 2019, on Netflix. On October 24, 2019, the series was renewed for a second season which premiered on January 1, 2021. In March 2021, the series was canceled after two seasons.

== Cast ==
- Irene Azuela as Ana María Carranza Dávila
- Osvaldo Benavides as Andrés Carranza Dávila
- Juan Manuel Bernal as Joaquin Carranza Dávila
- Rosa María Bianchi as Cecilia Dávila vda. de Carranza
- Antonio de la Vega as Bernardo
- Luis Rábago as Agustín Carranza
- Sophie Gómez as Amelia
- James Hyde as Martin Ross
- Carla Adell as Camila Ross Carranza
- Regina Pavón as Lourdes Carranza
- Dalí Jr González as Pablo Carranza
- Alejandro de Hoyos as Rodrigo Ross Carranza
- José Manuel Rincón as Gonzalo Carranza
- Daniela Schmidt as Pilar Ortega
- Gabriela de la Garza as Jimena
- Fernanda Castillo as Sofía Carranza
- Alejandro de la Madrid as Ignacio
- Marcus Ornellas as Jonás

== Episodes ==
Series	Episodes	Originally released
1	10	13 September 2019
2	8	1 January 2021

=== Season 1 (2019) ===
No. overall	No. in season	Title	English title	Directed by	Written by	Original release date
1	1	"El tostoneo"	"The Pruning"	Fernando Rovzar	Diego Gutierrez	13 September 2019
2	2	"El velorio"	"The Wake"	Fernando Rovzar	Story by : Fernando Rovzar & Sandra Gracía; Teleplay by : Diego Gutiérrez	13 September 2019
3	3	"La coronación"	"The Coronation"	Fernando Rovzar	Story by : Diego Gutiérrez; Teleplay by : Fernando Rovzar	13 September 2019
4	4	"Asquerosamente millonarios"	"Filthy Rich"	Natalia Beristáin	Story by : Diego Gutiérrez; Teleplay by : Júlia Denis	13 September 2019
5	5	"Centenario"	"Centennial"	Natalia Beristáin	Story by : Diego Gutiérrez; Teleplay by : Ana Sofía Clerici	13 September 2019
6	6	"La otra realidad"	"The Other Reality"	Natalia Beristáin	Story by : Diego Gutiérrez; Teleplay by : Sandra García Velten	13 September 2019
7	7	"Fondo"	"Bottom"	J.M Cravioto	Story by : Diego Gutiérrez; Teleplay by : Fernando Rovzar	13 September 2019
8	8	"La venganza de Tzitzimitl"	"The Revenge of Tzitzimitl"	J.M Cravioto	Story by : Diego Gutiérrez; Teleplay by : Júlia Denis	13 September 2019
9	9	"El Judas de Borges"	"Borges' Judas"	J.M Cravioto	Story by : Diego Gutiérrez; Teleplay by : Ana Sofía Clerici & Sandra García Velten	13 September 2019
10	10	"La jima"	"The Harvest"	Fernando Rovzar	Diego Gutiérrez	13 September 2019

=== Season 2 (2021) ===
No. overall	No. in season	Title	English title	Directed by	Written by	Original release date
11	1	"Todos tenemos secretos"	"We All Have Secrets"	Fernando Rovzar	Fernando Rovzar	1 January 2021
12	2	"Rebrandig"	"Rebrandig"	Fernando Rovzar	Julia Denis	1 January 2021
13	3	"Jugando con Fuego"	"Playing With Fire"	Gabriel Mariño	José Tamez	1 January 2021
14	4	"Ser o no ser"	"To Be or Not To Be"	José Manuel Cravioto	Fernando Fovzar	1 January 2021
15	5	"Dos casas"	"Two Houses"	José Manuel Cravioto	Alejandra Olvera Avila	1 January 2021
16	6	"Expuestos"	"Exposed"	José Manuel Cravioto	Julia Denis	1 January 2021
17	7	"Hasta que la muerte nos separe"	"Till Death Do Us Part"	José Manuel Cravioto, Fernando Rovzar	Alejandra Olvera Avila	1 January 2021
18	8	"El verdugo"	"The Executioner"	José Manuel Cravioto, Fernando Rovzar	José Tamez	1 January 2021
