= Intermedio (film) =

2005 film by Andrew Lauer

- Directed by: Andrew Lauer
- Written by: David Michael Latt
- Produced by: David Michael Latt; David Rimawai
- Starring: Edward Furlong; Cerina Vincent; Amber Benson; Callard Harris; Steve Railsback; Paul Cram
- Cinematography: Neal Fredericks
- Edited by: David Michael Latt
- Release date: March 29, 2005
- Running time: 82 minutes
- Country: United States
- Language: English
- Budget: $1,000,000

Intermedio is a 2005 American horror film directed by Andrew Lauer.

== Plot ==
In a small California town, Malik (Edward Furlong) along with his former girlfriend Gen (Cerina Vincent) her friend Barbie (Amber Benson), and another friend named Wes (Callard Harris) take a weekend getaway to an old ghost town where Malik and Gen played when they were younger.

They arrive at a long-abandoned prospecting settlement which is said to contain miles of tunnels, some of which lead to the Mexican border less than a mile away. The four friends climb down into the tunnels, and are observed by a mysterious old man (Steve Railsback) from a short distance away. He tugs on a mysterious amulet hanging from a chain around his neck and pours what appears to be blood on the ground.

In the tunnels, the teenagers stumble into two Mexican drug dealers, Jorge (Alejandro Samaniego) and Al, along with their teenaged sidekick Zee (Paul Cram), hauling packets of contraband across the border. The drug dealers force the four teenagers to tag along with them. Suddenly, mysterious ghost-like creatures appear and begin to attack them, forcing the teenagers and drug runners to join forces and run to the nearest hatch to try to escape. The mysterious old man is seen stroking his necklace, summoning the mysterious creatures. One of them throws a hook and chain at Al, impaling him to the wall.

Barbie is then sliced in half at the waist when she attempts to stand on Jorge's shoulders to open another hatch. Most of Jorge's fingers are severed as well. Zee seems to have disappeared, and the remaining survivors climb into a boarded up shack. One of the creatures stabs Wes through the neck. Jorge is also killed by the creatures.

Malik and Gen soon discover a room filled with dozens of bodies that have been killed over the years. Zee appears again and leads them to a path. Eventually the two safely escape the tunnels only to discover that they have lost the keys to their car, and they ask the owner of a nearby house for a ride. The owner turns out to be the mysterious old man, although neither of the survivors know he is the one behind the attacks.

As the old man drives the two away in his truck, he offers them some beer. Gen drinks it and soon passes out. The old man stabs Malik in the legs and then knocks him out with chloroform.

Malik and Gen wake up back in the room filled with dead bodies, and after they each painfully remove the barbed wire binding their wrists, Gen discovers a small, narrow tunnel. They crawl under it and end up in the house of the old man. In the house they find a bedroom covered with newspaper clippings about a teenager named Zee who was murdered years earlier in the tunnels; the old man was a suspect in the killing. Zee reappears and shows them a passage underneath a bed. The old man soon finds the open passage and follows them into it.

Once again, the old man summons the ghostly creatures to attack the two survivors as they flee. Soon, Malik and Gen cross paths with the old man, who attacks them. The old man is about to murder Gen by slowly stabbing her in the neck when the previously silent Zee tells him to stop. Gen attacks the old man. Gen gets hold of the necklace and destroys it, and the creatures show up and kill the old man.

Later, Gen cuts herself with a knife, dripping her blood onto a rock as she says her goodbyes to Wes. She meets up with Malik and they safely make it to the surface. At daybreak, they flag down another pickup truck and ask the driver for a ride.

In the final scene, Malik and Gen are safely in a motel room. Malik then muses over the old man's ability to control spirits, wondering whether they could then control them too, which Gen simply shrugs off. The movie ends showing Wes and Barbie's dead bodies staring at Malik and Gen through their motel room window.

== Cast ==
Actor	Role
Edward Furlong	Malik
Cerina Vincent	Gen
Amber Benson	Barbie
Callard Harris	Wes
Steve Railsback	Old Mysterious Man
Paul Cram	Zee

== Release ==
The film was released on DVD by The Asylum Home Entertainment on Mar 29, 2005. It was re-released by Timeless Media on Jun 19, 2007.

== Reception ==
HorrorNews.net gave the film a negative review, criticizing the film's special effects, characters, and lack of continuity. The reviewer concluded, "Intermedio won’t sit on your top ten shelf but it has its moments. It screams of rental material that really only provides one point of interest. Cerina Vincent." Elaine Lamkin from Severed Cinema called the film "awful", and criticized the film's acting, obvious low-budget, and design of the title monsters. Lamkin concluded by writing, "I hate trashing low-budget horror movies as there are so many GOOD ones out there and nearly all of them are made by people who really CARE about them.... I really had high hopes for Intermedio but don't bother. There are no scares, the gory scenes aren't gross and there is just no logic to any of it. BIG disappointment!!"
