= Fray (film) =

- Release poster for Fray
- Directed by: Geoff Ryan
- Written by: Geoff Ryan
- Produced by: Jodi Redmond
- Starring: Bryan Kaplan; Marisa Costa; Wes Harris
- Cinematography: Jarin Blaschke
- Edited by: Geoff Ryan
- Music by: Jacob Lawson
- Distributed by: Indie Rights
- Release dates: April 13, 2012 (Arizona International Film Festival); April 18, 2014
- Country: United States
- Language: English

Fray is a 2012 independent film starring Bryan Kaplan and Marisa Costa. It was written and directed by Geoff Ryan, with cinematography by Jarin Blaschke, and produced by Jodi Redmond.

Fray was the winner of numerous awards during its film festival run, including Best Feature Film at both the UK Film Festival and the Arizona International Film Festival.

== Plot ==
Justin (Kaplan) is a United States Marine who has come home from five tours of duty, having seen combat action in both Iraq and Afghanistan. Life back home isn't much easier; he passes his time doing clean-up work at a lumber mill or tending to his injured leg at his barely furnished apartment. He attends classes at the nearby community college as he works to create a life beyond his military service. A romance begins with a young instructor (Costa), but Justin finds navigating commitment to be challenging. Paul (Harris), his boss at the mill, is an old veteran who offers help, but Justin has trouble accepting it.

Thanks to spotty work hours in a difficult economy, Justin is perpetually late with his rent. The difficulties in readjusting to home life leave him yelling at noises made by the neighbors or escaping into the woods for a little quiet time. When he gets news that some of his buddies overseas have died in a battle, he retreats into the woods as if to disappear there. Still, Cheri and Paul continue their efforts to break through.

== Cast ==
- Bryan Kaplan as Justin
- Marisa Costa as Cheri
- Wes Harris as Paul
- Drew Hicks as Matt
- Evan Honer as Pete
- Catherine Johnson as Vicky

== Production ==
Writer-director Geoff Ryan got the idea for his film when his wounded cousin returned home from Iraq. The veteran recovered well, largely because he had a tight family to lean on for whatever support he needed, but told stories of some of his buddies who had to deal with issues that were "not just the physical or the psychological, but the bureaucratic" that Ryan had never heard before. Some of the men were discharged from hospitals only to wind up on the streets.

Ryan said it would be impossible for him to understand what going through combat was like, but decided that their experience back home was something he could tap into. He began traveling across the United States to meet with and interview homeless veterans. Ryan initially wanted to do a documentary, but found his subjects unwilling to open up in front of a camera.

He tried a "short film experiment", and it turned out well enough that he began looking for actors for a feature film version. He wrote the part of Justin with Bryan Kaplan in mind because "I knew he could pull it off." Ryan gathered a "phenomenally talented group of friends" in 2010; principal photography was completed over one month in the mountains along the Oregon coast. The response by critics and audiences surprised Ryan, who thought the film "would be on YouTube for five or six friends to see."

== Critical reception ==
Film Threat in its 2012 review praised the "realism and humanity" in a "slow-boiling drama" that puts the burden on the performers to keep the audience engaged. "To that end, Bryan Kaplan is tasked with carrying the entire film and shows that he is up to the challenge." Dances With Films called Fray "the Coming Home for this generation of veterans of foreign wars" and said it will break the viewer's heart, "only to put it back together stronger than it was before."

Fray made its theatrical debut at the Arena Cinema Hollywood on April 18, 2014. The Los Angeles Times called Fray "a stirring and involving character study that may not cover much new ground but still packs a quiet punch." Writer Gary Goldstein praised Kaplan and Costa in particular, along with the film's "grit and authenticity—and a welcome lack of mind's-eye combat flashbacks". Though numerous films have tackled the story of war veterans struggling to return to civilian life, Goldstein suggested that film-goers "give Fray a chance."

LA Weekly called the film's "quietude" its greatest strength. Michael Nordine found the dialogue between Justin and his new lover "a little too direct, and their key emotional scene escalates much too quickly," but said the look in Justin's eyes when a prospective employer compares the job to a battlefield makes "the flaws fall away".

== Awards ==
- Grand Jury Prize winner at Dances With Films (2012)
- 2012 Best Feature Film, UK Film Festival
- 2012 Best Feature Film, Arizona International Film Festival
- Best Lead Actor, Brooklyn Film Festival (2012)
