= Sticky: A (Self) Love Story =

2016 film by Nicholas Tana

- Directed by: Nicholas Tana
- Written by: Nicholas Tana
- Produced by: Nicholas Tana; Eric Wolfson; Denise Acosta
- Starring: Janeane Garofalo; Larry Flynt; Nina Hartley; Joycelyn Elders; Keith Morris; Joe Matt; Chris Gore; Betty Dodson
- Edited by: Johann Martinez; Eric Wolfson
- Music by: Richard Albert; Nicholas Tana; Billy Steinberg
- Release date: February 14, 2016
- Running time: 72 minutes
- Country: United States
- Language: English

Sticky: A (Self) Love Story is a 2016 documentary and comedy film by Nicholas Tana that attempts to explain why most people are afraid to discuss masturbation. The movie is one of the first documentaries to address the myths and social taboos around masturbation. The trailer for Sticky: A (Self) Love Story was selected as top trailers of the week by IndieWire.

== Impact on sex education ==
The feature-length documentary has received positive reviews in national media for its controversial stance in favor of masturbation as part of sex education. The filmmaker Nicholas Tana was paid to speak during a screening of his film at the 47th. annual American Association of Sex Educators, Counselors, and Therapists (A.A.S.E.C.T.) conference in Minneapolis in 2015 during which time an early educational cut of the film was screened in front of over a hundred certified sex educators.

The A.A.S.E.C.T. screening resulted in invitations to conduct educational screenings at Arizona State University sponsored by VOX Voices For Planned Parenthood, University of Wisconsin sponsored by Sex Outloud, and Eastern Michigan University spearheaded by Pam Landau of the Psychology department in April 2016 and ending in May 2016 in honor of international Masturbation Month.

The film addresses the need for sex education that discusses masturbation in a healthy manner to students; it includes interviews with sex educators who express concerns about not properly educating children around sex and masturbation. Harvard University screened Sticky: A (Self) Love Story on campus in Cambridge, Massachusetts, on April 4, 2017, as part of Harvard's Sex Weekend.

== Contrasting viewpoints on health ==
Full of interviews from sex educators, religious figures, and psychologists, the documentary offers often contrasting opinions about the health benefits both physically and psychologically of masturbation. Among those interviewed who believe masturbation could be harmful is Alexander Rhodes, the founder of a popular Reddit masturbation abstinence group called NoFap. The movie also includes health findings associated with a Cambridge Study that link masturbation to prostate cancer.

These perspectives are contrasted with sex-positive statements from notable sex educators who speak in favor of the health benefits of masturbation. The film also references a medical study written in JAMA indicating that masturbation might help to prevent prostate cancer.

== Sex-positive feminism ==
The film contains interviews with some of the founding members of the sex-positive feminism movement. These interviewees include Nina Hartley, Betty Dodson, Joani Blank, and Carol Queen. Judy Norsidian and Wendy Sanford who worked for many years on the publication of the historical sex education book Our Bodies, Ourselves both appear in the film.

== Issues ==
Among the issues discussed in the film is the Anti-Obscenity Act that bans the sale of sex toys in the state of Alabama, and the contradictory stances of four major religions surrounding masturbation, which include Catholicism, Islam, Buddhism, and Judaism.

Other topics include the controversial "firing" of the first African American female Surgeon General, Dr. Joycelyn Elders, by former U.S. President Bill Clinton; the career damaging fall-out after Paul Reubens's (Pee-Wee Herman) arrest for being caught in a pornographic theatre; current debates concerning sex education; the billion dollar sex toy industry; contradictory prostate cancer studies linked to male masturbation; the news media's obsession with sex addiction and sexual compulsion; the F.B.I. study that links compulsive masturbation to serial killers; the impact of pornography on relationships; opinions as to the future of masturbation.

== Masturbation in politics ==
The film contains an interview with the first African American appointed as Surgeon General, Joycelyn Elders, about why she was fired by former president Bill Clinton for her controversial statement on world's A.I.D.S. day in favor of sex education on masturbation, an interview with comedian Janeane Garofalo about her embarrassment on doing the phone sex masturbation scene in The Truth About Cats & Dogs, and an interview with Hustler creator Larry Flynt about how he came to discover masturbation.

== Masturbation in film, TV, and music ==
The impact of masturbation on the media is explored through a series of movie clips and music. Film Threat founder and film critic Chris Gore states in the documentary that most instances of masturbation depicted in movies or television are seen as either grotesque or as something one wouldn't want to be caught doing. This comment is substantiated by clips from movies like The Exorcist and American Pie shown in the film.

Television clips from the Seinfeld episode called "The Contest" and a clip from Sex in the City are also discussed, along with songs that make reference to masturbation in some way. A section in the film on Masturbation and Media includes interviews with comedian ANT, and Keith Morris, singer/songwriter formerly of Black Flag and The Circle Jerks. The movie features an acoustic performance of "I Touch Myself" played by its songwriter, Billy Steinberg, who is also interviewed.

== V.O.D. distribution ==
First distributed in time for Valentine's Day in February 2016 by Vision Films Inc., a partner of Sony Pictures Home Entertainment in February 2016, Sticky: A (Self) Love Story has been selected as an Amazon Video Direct Stars (A.V.D.) winner in July 2016 after being one of Amazon's top-selling films online. At the time of this article, the documentary is being distributed in the U.S., Canada, U.K., Italy, Israel, Brazil, and Germany.

== Theatrical screenings ==
There have been numerous theatrical screenings of Sticky: A (Self) Love Story around the world. These include screenings in New York, Las Vegas, Los Angeles, San Francisco, and San Diego and sold out screenings at MoSex in New York, Syndicated in Brooklyn, and the historic Chinese Theater in Hollywood, California. Sticky: A (Self) Love Story opened at the first annual Lov Doc Film Festival in Moscow, Russia, in 2016.
