= Move Me No Mountain (film) =

- Theatrical Poster
- Directed by: Deborah Richards
- Written by: Deborah Richards
- Produced by: Patrick Wirtz; Deborah Richards; Michelle Schwarzer; Anthony Cogburn; Christian Stibbe
- Starring: Cat Lellie; Nicholas Roylance; Amanda Forstrom; Layla Campbell; Staci Dickerson; Scott Ables; Sophia Battinus
- Cinematography: Deborah Richards
- Edited by: Deborah Richards
- Music by: David Rosen; Travis Lohmann
- Distributed by: Indie Rights
- Release date: February 21, 2023 (United States)
- Running time: 84 minutes
- Country: United States
- Language: English

Move Me No Mountain is a 2023 American drama film written, produced, and directed by Deborah Richards. The film follows a successful real estate agent who becomes homeless on the streets of Las Vegas after suffering a personal tragedy. Move Me No Mountain was released in the United States in February 2023.

== Plot ==
Jenna Anderson, a successful Las Vegas real estate agent, loses her daughter in an accident. She blames herself for the death. Overcome with guilt, Jenna loses interest in her daily life and routine and chooses to live homeless on the streets of Las Vegas. Jenna meets The Captain who teaches her lessons about life on the streets. Jenna starts a promising relationship with Nick, another homeless person, but her sense of guilt and self-punishment forces her to abandon all her relationships, until she meets Lizbeth, a homeless child. Lizbeth is being exploited by Ruth, another homeless woman, who feels threatened by Jenna's maternal instincts towards Lizbeth and drives her away from Jenna. While living in a tunnel beneath the city, Jenna survives an attack by a mentally-disturbed man. Without no hope left, Jenna leaves the city and walks into the desert. There she encounters a rave and loses herself to the music and dancing. Losing her ego to the experience, Jenna returns to Las Vegas a lifeless zombie. Ready to give up on life, Jenna has a chance encounter with Lizbeth, seemingly abandoned by Ruth. Trying to find Ruth, Jenna has a run in with a drug dealer and decides she will take over responsibility of Lizbeth. Welcomes by Nick, Jenna and Lizbeth enter a homeless shelter.

== Cast ==
- Cat Lellie as Jenna Anderson
- Nicholas Roylance as Nick
- Amanda Forstrom as Ruth
- Layla Campbell as Lizbeth
- Staci Dickerson as Sally
- Scott Ables as The Captain
- Sophia Battinus as Gigi Anderson
- Dave Mazany as The Maniac
- Julio Bana Fernandez as Ronnie
- Zachariah Moyes as Zebra Head
- L.A. Walker as L. A. Walker

== Release ==
The distributor, Indie Rights, released the film in the United States on VOD on February 21, 2023.

== Reception ==
On Rotten Tomatoes, the film has an approval rating of 43% based on reviews from 23 critics, with an average rating of 5.8/10.
