= The Bestowal =

2019 film by Andrew de Burgh

- Directed by: Andrew de Burgh
- Written by: Andrew de Burgh
- Produced by: Andrew de Burgh
- Starring: Sam Brittan; Sharmita Bhattacharya
- Cinematography: Matt Fore
- Edited by: Fernando Viquez
- Music by: Marc Timón
- Production company: Sacred Ember Films
- Distributed by: Indie Rights
- Release dates: May 18, 2019 (MegaCon); November 21, 2019 (United States)
- Running time: 90 minutes
- Country: United States
- Language: English

The Bestowal is a 2019 independent American science fiction drama film written, produced and directed by Andrew de Burgh, in his feature debut.

It had its World Premiere at MegaCon on May 18, 2019, and was released by Indie Rights on Amazon Prime Video, Tubi, Google Play and YouTube Movies on November 21, 2019.

== Plot ==
Steven Karius is a selfish and suicidal businessman who, just moments before he is about to kill himself, is visited by an inter-dimensional incarnation of Death who appears in the form of a beautiful young woman. She persuades him to dedicate his life to altruistic causes and twenty years later when she visits him again, a series of unexpected events ensue.

== Cast ==
- Sam Brittan as Steven Karius
- Sharmita Bhattacharya as Death

== Production ==
Taking inspiration from 2001: A Space Odyssey, Interstellar as well as the scientific works of Stephen Hawking, de Burgh started writing the screenplay in the summer of 2017. He spent time researching various scientific topics, including the interdimensional hypothesis, the chronology of the universe, astronomy, planetary science and the Big Bang.

After finishing the screenplay in January 2018, he started assembling the cast and crew. Sam Brittan and Sharmita Bhattacharya signed on to play the leads in March 2018. Soon after, Marc Timón who scored the Goya Award nominated film El pequeño mago signed on to compose and orchestrate the original soundtrack.

Principal photography took place in Los Angeles in May 2018. In August 2018, a teaser trailer was released. In January 2019, the official theatrical trailer was released.

== Release ==
The film had its World Premiere at MegaCon in May 2019. It also screened at the Dhaka International Film Festival, the Los Angeles IFS Film Festival (where it won the Best Actress Award), the Hoboken International Film Festival, the Love International Film Festival (where it won the Best Screenplay Award), the Lake City International Film Festival (where it won the Best Director Award) and the Clifton Film Celebration.

It was released on November 21, 2019, on Amazon Prime Video, Tubi, Google Play and YouTube Movies by Indie Rights.

== Reception ==
The movie received generally positive reviews from critics. On Rotten Tomatoes, the film has an approval rating of 75%, based on eight reviews. Starburst critic Ryan Pollard gave it a 7 out of 10 and called it "unique, challenging and thought-provoking". In his review of the film, Battle Royale with Cheese critic Mark Goodyear praised the final act, stating "the film finally manages to express something to the audience; bonds between people are transcendent. In this respect, it is reminiscent of Interstellar though de Burgh doesn't capitalise on the point so much as Christopher Nolan does. Regardless it is a cinematic theme worth investigating, and de Burgh manages to shine a glimmer of new light upon it which is worth commending."

Elements of Madness critic Douglas Davidson gave it a 3.5 out of 5, stating "the crux of de Burgh's story is how significant every life lived can be when given the chance. It's a valuable message for those patient enough to receive it." Film Threat critic Alex Saveliev gave it a 3 out of 10, stating "Andrew de Burgh tackles existential, cosmic issues and mixes the theological, the religious and the scientific with such reckless abandon, his reach far exceeds his grasp."
