= Capps Crossing =

2017 slasher film by Mike Stahl

- Directed by: Mike Stahl
- Written by: Mike Stahl
- Produced by: Mike Stahl
- Starring: Brian Cory; Alex Acosta; Parker Alexander; Marcus Parker; Isabel Siragusa; Ashley Sullivan; Quenya Tuck
- Cinematography: Alejandro Guimoye
- Edited by: Andrew Florio
- Music by: Greg Shields
- Production company: Aaronde Entertainment
- Distributed by: Indie Rights
- Release date: June 9, 2017
- Running time: 85 minutes
- Country: United States
- Language: English

Capps Crossing is a 2017 American slasher film directed by Mike Stahl, starring Brian Cory, Alex Acosta, Parker Alexander, Marcus Parker, Isabel Siragusa, Ashley Sullivan and Quenya Tuck.

== Cast ==
- Brian Cory as David
- Alex Acosta as Rob
- Parker Alexander asJustin
- Marcus Parker as Kyle
- Isabel Siragusa as Kara
- Ashley Sullivan as Robin
- Quenya Tuck as Jessica
- Gary Cooney as Ranger Mills
- D.J. Hale as Jeremy
- Sarah Leo as Tracy
- David L. Peters as Tracy's Dad

== Reception ==
Kieran Fisher of Scream rated the film 2 stars out of 5 and called it "predictable in every way".

Matt Boiselle of Dread Central rated the film 2 stars out of 5 and called the premise "as plain as blood splattered on a nice white wall".

Kimber Myers of the Los Angeles Times wrote: "Unfortunately, the worst fault in this horror movie isn’t the amateur performances, beginner-level editing or the special effects; it’s the dreadfully dumb script."
