= We Make Movies =

2016 American mockumentary film

- Official poster
- Directed by: Matt Tory
- Written by: Matt Tory
- Produced by: Matt Tory; Daniel Beresford
- Starring: Jordan Hopewell; Matt Tory; Zack Slort; Anne Crockett; Jonathan Holmes; Matt Silver
- Cinematography: Austin Duncan
- Music by: The Freak Fandango Orchestra
- Production company: 4Reel Films
- Distributed by: Indie Rights
- Release date: September 24, 2016
- Running time: 111 minutes
- Country: United States
- Language: English

We Make Movies is a 2016 American mockumentary comedy independent film written and directed by Matt Tory. It premiered in 2016 at the Columbia Gorge International Film Festival, before being released by Indie Rights on February 14, 2017.

== Synopsis ==
When egotistical student Director Stevphen Bixby wants to make a movie for his town's Film Festival, cameras look "behind the scenes" as he rounds up his friends - and some bystanders - to help make his masterpiece: a movie that blends together all the greatest films ever made.

== Cast ==
- Matt Tory as Stevphen Bixby, an inept college student who considers himself the next Steven Spielberg.
- Jordan Hopewell as Donny, a socially awkward neighbor and lifelong best friend of Stevphen.
- Zack Slort as Leonard, a local method actor.
- Anne Crockett as Jessica, Donny's sarcastic cousin.
- Jonathan Holmes as Garth, an old friend of Stevphen's who gets roped into helping out.
- Matt Silver as Curtis, a film student who Stevphen considers his arch nemesis.
- Josiah Finnamore as Kurtis, the thief.
- Valerie Tory as Stevphen's Mother.

== Production ==
The film was shot over the summer of 2014 in Sacramento, California on an estimated budget of $1,000.

When asked about the inspiration behind the film, Tory cited his childhood spent making movies in the backyard with his friends. "I wanted to tell a story about the 'grab-a-video-camera-and-your-friends-and-shoot-in-the-backyard' phase of making movies that all budding filmmakers go through before they move to Hollywood," he told Movie Paradise.

== Release ==
The film had its World Premiere at the Columbia Gorge International Film Festival in Big Bear on September 24, 2016, where it won the Triangle Award. It continued on to screen at the Davis International Film Festival in Davis, California on October 14, 2016, where it won the award for Best Young Filmmaker.

The film was distributed and released by Indie Rights and released on Amazon, Google Play and Blu-Ray on February 14, 2017.
