= Paul Cram =

American actor

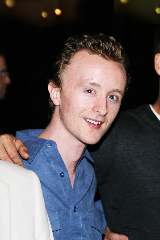
- Cram in March 2008 at the 20th Century Fox theater premiere of Contract Killers
- Born: Paul Nolan Cram; October 31, 1985 (age 40); Augusta, Maine, U.S.
- Height: 6 ft (183 cm)
- Website: www.paulcramactor.com

Paul Matthew Cram (born October 31, 1985) is an American actor. He is known for his role as "Zee", in the film Intermedio.

== Filmography ==
- Sugar & Spice (2001) - as Fickle Video Renter (uncredited)
- Intermedio (2005) - as Zee
- Chiseled (2006) - as Charlie
- (Yielding to) A Willing Breath (2006) - as Bryan
- 13 Hours in a Warehouse (2008) - as Craig Teller
- Contract Killers (2008) - as Chuck Dittmer
- Peacock (2010) - as Kenny

Paul hails from a sprawling west coast family of 15. His interest in art is an oddity for his family because of his father's military career, five of his brother's military background, & two sisters working on the police force, as well as his family's legacy of making maps.
