= Adventures of a Teenage Dragon Slayer =

2010 television film directed by Andrew Lauer

- Directed by: Andrew Lauer
- Screenplay by: Jamie Nash
- Produced by: Ryil Adamson; Gavin Gillette
- Starring: Lea Thompson; Hunter Allan; Eric Lutes; Richard Sellers; Abigail Victor; Ryan Bradley Norris; Jordan Reynolds; Amy Pietz; Andrew Lauer; Wendie Malick
- Cinematography: Luis Molina Robinson
- Edited by: Brent Peterson; Coby Dax
- Music by: Mark Oates
- Production company: Razor Sharp Productions
- Distributed by: Screen Media Films
- Release date: April 16, 2010
- Running time: 93 minutes
- Country: United States
- Language: English

Adventures of a Teenage Dragon Slayer, also known as I Was a 7th Grade Dragon Slayer and Adventures of a Dragon Hunter, is a 2010 American adventure comedy family film directed by Andrew Lauer. It stars Lea Thompson, Hunter Allan, Eric Lutes, Richard Sellers, Abby Victor, and Ryan Bradley Norris. (Thompson, Lutes & Lauer all also co-starred in the sitcom Caroline in the City ).

== Cast ==
- Lea Thompson as Laura
- Hunter Allan as Arthur
- Eric Lutes as Shane
- Richard Sellers as Bart
- Abigail Victor as Natalie
- Ryan Bradley Norris as Tim
- Jordan Reynolds as Larry Metz
- Amy Pietz as Officer Annie
- Andrew Lauer as Dad
- Wendie Malick as Vice Principal Metz
