= Schaal (surname) =

Schaal (Hebrew: שָׁאַל), sometimes spelled Shaal or Shael, is a Sephardic Jewish and Dutch Surname, common among Jews of French, East-European and Middle Eastern background, descended from Spanish exiles.

== Etymology ==
The source of the name is debated. Some have linked it to the Hebrew phrase "shaal" (to ask, inquire). Some linguists argue that it is rooted in the ancient town ShaalBim as mentioned the bible as a "place of foxes" (Joshua 19:42), indicating that the Schaal name-bearers are members of the Cohen tribe. Due to phonetic differences the Schaal family members who lived in Salonika bore the name Shaul, Shoual or Shaoul, indicating that the name derives from King Shaul.

Since the 18th century, members of the family had settled predominantly in France, South-Eastern Europe and parts of Germany.

== People ==
=== Schaal family of France ===
Schaal is the name of a notable Jewish family descended from Spanish exiles who, after the expulsion of the Jews from Spain in 1492 and the following decades, settled in France and Germany. The family includes:

- François Ignace Schaal (1747–1833), French general and commander of the Republican army

=== Others ===
- Ben Zion Abba Shaul (1924–1998), Sephardic rabbi, Torah scholar, and halakhic arbiter
- Richard Schaal (1928–2014), American actor
- Wendy Schaal (born 1954), American actress
- Dror Shaul (born 1971), Israeli filmmaker
- Kristen Schaal (born 1978), American actress, voice actress, comedian, and writer

== See also ==
- Marranos
- Crypto-Jews
- Spanish and Portuguese Jews
- Sephardim
- Ladino
