= Andrew Lauer =

American actor (born 1965)

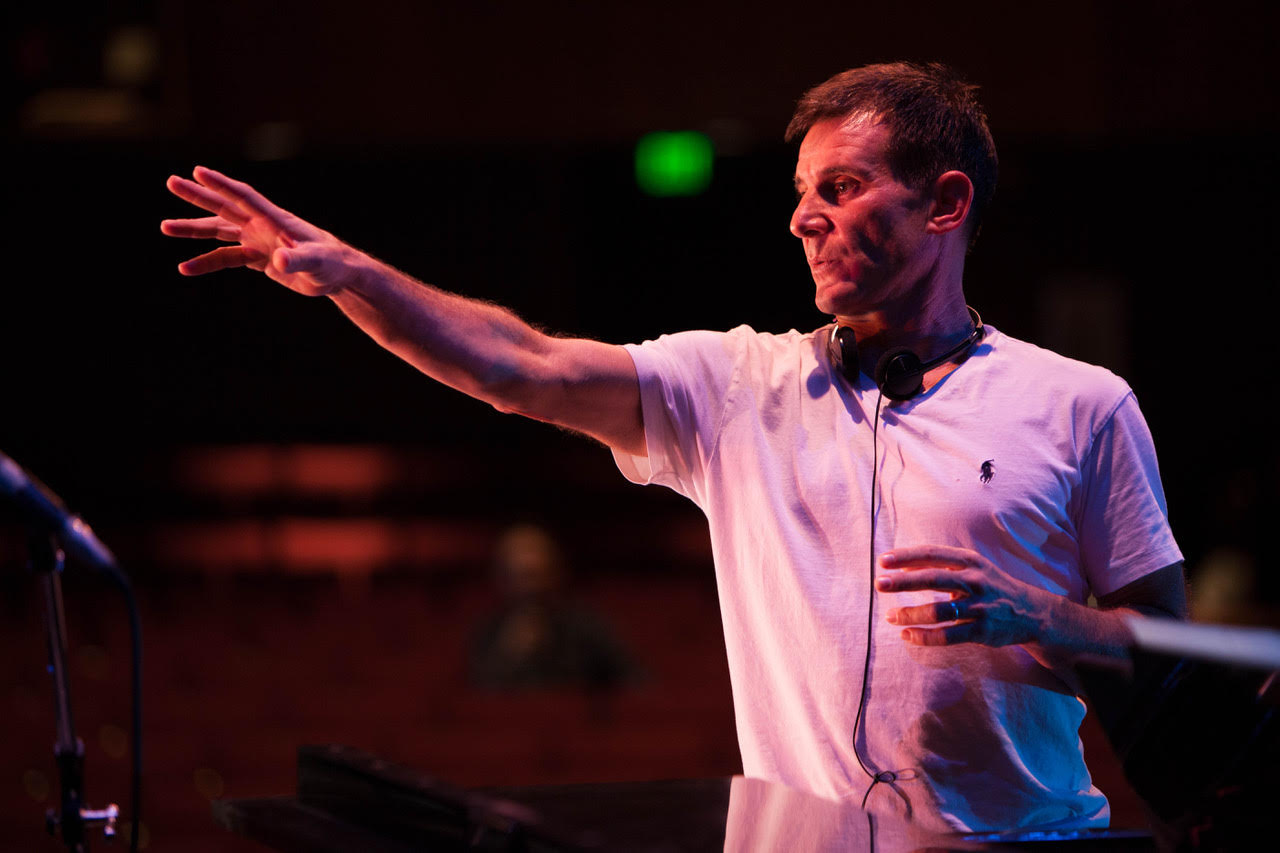
- Lauer directing "The Tehuacan Project"
- Born: Andrew Michael Lauer; June 19, 1965 (age 61); Los Angeles, California
- Other name: Andy Lauer
- Citizenship: American
- Education: San Diego State University, University of New Hampshire
- Occupations: Film director, producer, screenwriter, actor, social activist
- Years active: 1984–present
- Title: President & CEO at ReelAid & Senior Director/Producer at Motive Entertainment & Director/Writer at Brillstein Entertainment Partners
- Spouse: Melisa Kashiwahara
- Children: 3
- Website: ReelAid; Motive Entertainment; Brillstein Entertainment Partners

Andrew Michael Lauer (born June 19, 1965) (also known as Andy Lauer) is an American feature and documentary filmmaker, actor, and social activist.

Lauer is the Founder President & CEO of ReelAid, a non-profit organization made up of filmmakers from the Hollywood community producing low to no-cost promotional videos for other non-profit organizations who in turn use them to fund-raise and create public awareness.

== Early life ==
Lauer was born in Los Angeles to an attorney father and an actress mother. He engaged as an actor from ages 9 to 11 and then stopped for the sake of normal childhood.

Lauer is a Triathlete having competed in such races as Alcatraz, WildFlower and Malibu. He captained his high school's gymnastics team.

He attended San Diego State University and then transferred to University of New Hampshire; he chose the Theater & Arts and Journalism there. He worked as a busboy to subsidize his studies at the New York Friars Club, where he was influenced by the comic legends Red Skelton, Milton Berle, Henny Youngman and Lucille Ball. After the completion of his studies, he traveled through Europe and then he settled in New York to start his career. In 1987, he returned to Los Angeles and improved his comedic abilities with The Groundlings and L.A. Connection.

== Career ==
He began his career in front of the camera with major roles in film and TV including Never on Tuesday (with Peter Berg), Born on the Fourth of July (with Tom Cruise), For the Boys (with Bette Midler) and Iron Man 3 (with Robert Downey Jr.). He has mentored under the direction of filmmakers Oliver Stone, Michael Bay, David Fincher and James Burrows.

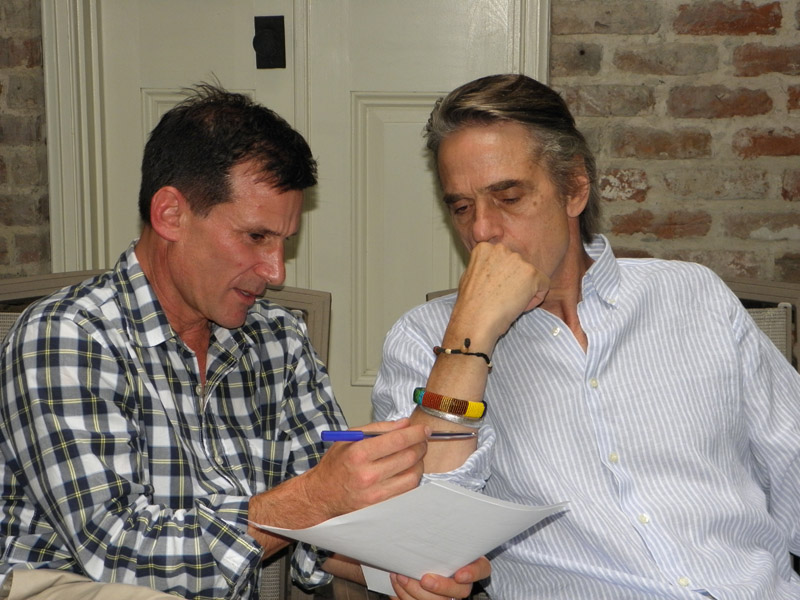
Lauer with English actor Jeremy Irons

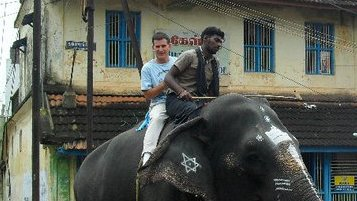
Lauer on an elephant ride during the production of Sahaya Going Beyond

As an actor, Lauer is probably best known for playing "Charlie" on the NBC comedy series Caroline in the City.

He has directed and produced the feature film Adventures of a Teenage Dragon Slayer starring Lea Thompson (Back to the Future) and Wendie Malick (Racing Stripes). The film was released in theaters Spring 2011 and went on to stay on the family charts for 28 consecutive weeks. Lauer’s project, Gridiron Heroes, won Best Feature Documentary at the International Family Film Festival in 2015. The film follows fallen High School footballers and features actor Taylor Kitsch (Friday Night Lights), football legends Mike Ditka, Kurt Warner, Deacon Jones, Dallas Cowboys owner Jerry Jones and Commentator Al Michaels. He was also involved in a sister-project executive produced by Peter Berg (Friday Night Lights, Battleship) titled Head’s Up Tackling.

He also had triple duties directing/writing/producing The Tehuacan Project in 2007, a story about deaf children in rural Tehuacan in Mexico. Lauer's roommate after college, Brad Pitt executive produced. Adrien Brody narrated the film with Esai Morales; Prior to that he received critical acclaim for his feature film Intermedio, a supernatural thriller starring Edward Furlong (Terminator 2: Judgment Day, American History X) and Amber Benson (Buffy the Vampire Slayer) and the multi-award-winning short film, Little Cuba.

Lauer's next project was Sahaya Going Beyond about a ragtag but heroic group working together to fight HIV in India, narrated by Academy Award winner Jeremy Irons. It was completed in 2013.

His next film Prince of Malacca is a love story of reincarnation of a Prince from the Kingdom of Malacca and a Princess from Singapura. In addition to directing this film Lauer will also stand in as a producer.

In 2016, an Indiegogo campaign was launched to help raise $35,000 to fund a gay themed romantic comedy movie entitled "Please Don't Eat the Pansies". The cast included actor/writer Ronnie Kerr, Mary Wilson of The Supremes, singer/actor Tom Goss and Andrew.

== Other interests ==
Lauer developed an interest in toxic mold remediation after a home renovation went awry. He went on to attain professional certifications and start a mold remediation firm in Santa Monica, California.

== Filmography ==
=== Film ===
Year	Title	Role	Notes
1984	Blame It on the Night	Boy In Audience	
1989	The Preppie Murder	Josh	Television film
1989	Never on Tuesday	Matt	
1989	Born on the Fourth of July	Vet - Villa Dulce	
1991	The Doors	UCLA Student	
1991	Necessary Roughness	Charlie Banks	
1991	For the Boys	Corpsman On Battlefield, Korea	
1995	Screamers	Private Michael 'Ace' Jefferson	
1998	I'll Be Home for Christmas	Nolan	
2000	Gun Shy	Jerry M. Feinstein / Jason Cane	
2001	August Underground		
2002	Jane White Is Sick & Twisted	Desiree	
2002	Motherly Love	Irving	
2003	Tiger in the Arms	Adam Cuthbert	Short
2004	Just Desserts	Jacques Du Jacques	Television film
2004	Fish Burglars	Robert	Short
2005	Jane Doe: The Wrong Face	Marvin	Television film
2005	H.G. Wells' War of the Worlds	Kerry Williams	Video
2005	Legion of the Dead	Sam Weaver	Video
2005	The Beast of Bray Road	Jack Berka	
2005	King of the Lost World	Steven	
2005	Dating Games People Play	Tommy	
2006	Faith Happens	Bill	
2007	Rattle Basket	Jonathen	
2007	Goldfish	Ted, The Neighbor	Short
2008	Purgatory	Bobby	Video
2008	Jane Doe: Eye of the Beholder	Marvin Apple	Television film
2009	Wannabe	Jason	Short
2010	I Was a 7th Grade Dragon Slayer	Dad	
2010	All Together	Dad	
2010	The Last Call	Last Hit	Video short
2011	Wannabe Too	Unknown	Short
2012	Stuck	Donald	Short
2012	CSI: Miami - Season 10: Miami Meets Mother Nature	Frank	Video short
2013	Iron Man 3	Satellite Technician	
2013	Sox	Dale Hooger	
2015	Shooting the Warwicks	Mr. Rudofsky	
2015	The Gun Collector	Ron Hathaway	Short
2015	Badge of Faith	Bryan	
2016	Criminal Minds - Season 11: Criminology: The Bond	Meyers	Video short
2017	Spreading Darkness	Antonio	
2021	Swim	Noah Samson	
2021	Goodbye, Butterfly	Stan Granger	
TBA	The Diamond Collector	Detective Sully	Pre-production
2024	The Seductress from Hell	Officer Gerrard	

=== Television ===
Year	Title	Role	Notes
1989	21 Jump Street	Psycho	2 episodes
1989	Highway To Heaven	Colin McCormick	1 episode
1990	Grand	Officer Wayne Kasmurski	13 episodes
1990	Thirtysomething	Ernest Leight	1 episode
1991	Brooklyn Bridge	Young Myron Grossman	1 episode
1992	Doogie Howser, M.D.	Theatre Manager	1 episode
1992–1993	Going to Extremes	Charlie Moran	17 episodes
1993	Matlock	Todd McCormick	
1994	Murder, She Wrote	Ernie Fishman	
1995	High Sierra Search and Rescue	Ben Phillips	
1998	C-16: FBI	Ritchie	
1995–1999	Caroline in the City	Charlie	74 episodes
2003	The John Kerwin Show	Guest	
2005	Jane Doe: The Wrong Face	Marvin Apple	
2008	Estate of Panic	Himself	Season 1, Episode 3 - 2nd Place
2008	Jane Doe: Eye of the Beholder	Marvin Apple	
2013	Wipeout	Himself (contestant)	
2014	The Royals	Kevin	
2015	The 101	Kevin	

=== Director ===
Year	Film	Notes
2005	Intermedio	
2007	The Tehuacan Project	Documentary
2010	Adventures of a Teenage Dragon Slayer	
2010	Going Beyond	Documentary
2011	The Hill Chris Climbed: The Gridiron Heroes Story	Documentary(Multiple Awards received including Best Documentary Feature LA Film Festival)
2013	Sahaya Going Beyond	Documentary(Multiple Awards received including Best Documentary)
2013	ronman 3	
2014	"Sox"	
2015	The One I Wrote For You" Director	
2015	"The Edison Language Academy" Director	
2015	Shooting The Warwicks	
2015	The Gun Collector	
2015	Badge Of Faith	
2016	Criminal Minds	
2016	The Edison Language Academy" Director	
2017	Drib	
2017	Spreading Darkness	
2021	Goodbye Butterfly	
2021	Swim	
2021	Dreams From The Edge	
2022	Jacked	
2022	Remember Me: The Mahalia Jackson	
2023	Nine Devine	
2024	Strange Harvest Occult Murder	
2024	A Journey Home" Director	
