= Just One Drink =

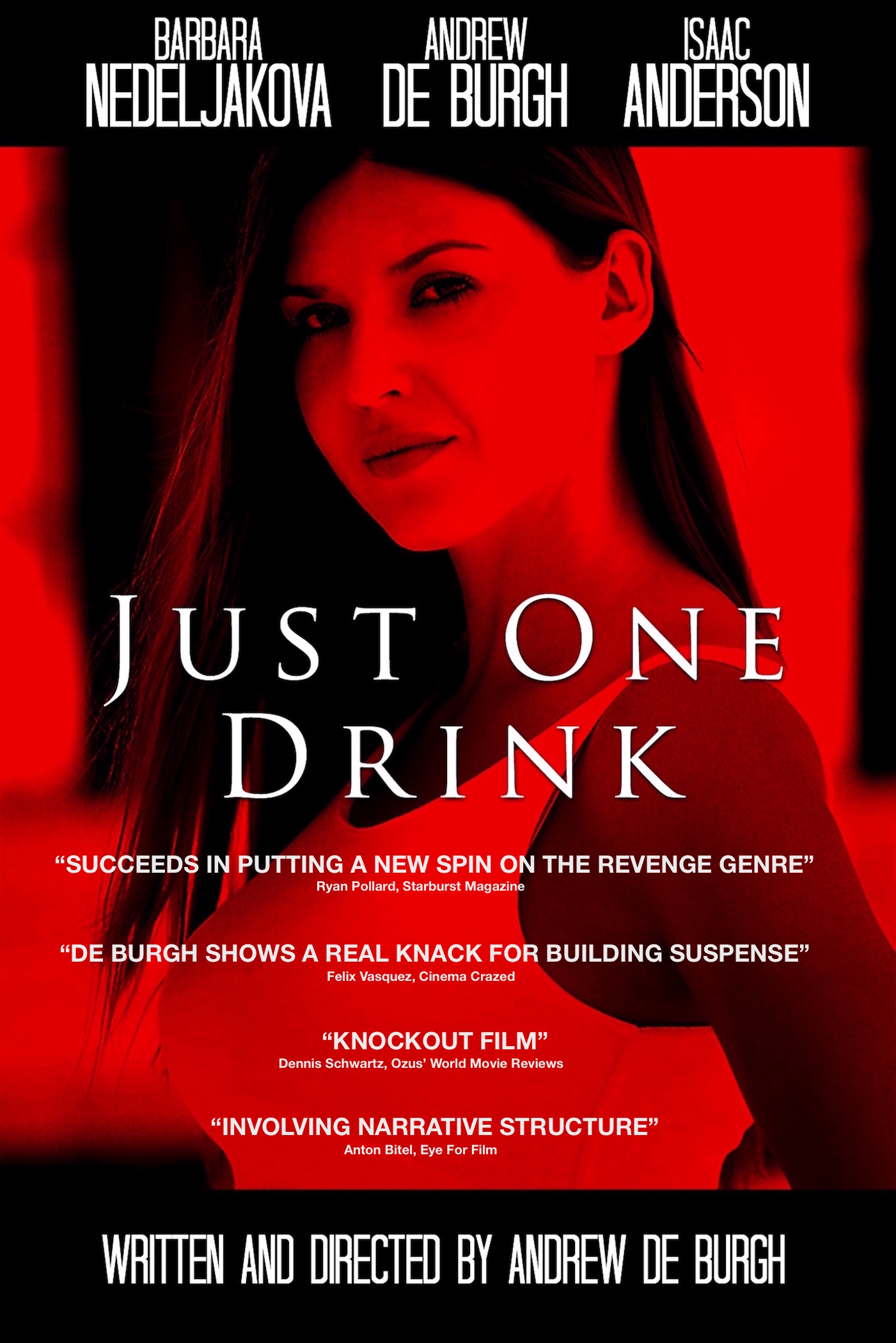
- Directed by: Andrew de Burgh
- Written by: Andrew de Burgh
- Produced by: Andrew de Burgh; Esther Washington
- Starring: Barbara Nedeljakova; Andrew de Burgh; Isaac Anderson
- Cinematography: Luca Mercuri
- Edited by: Jason Christopher
- Music by: Elezeid
- Distributed by: ShortsTV
- Release date: November 7, 2015 (Chinese American Film Festival)
- Running time: 19 minutes
- Country: United States
- Language: English

Just One Drink is a 2015 American psychological thriller short film written, produced and directed by Andrew de Burgh, who also stars opposite Barbara Nedeljakova. It premiered at the 2015 Chinese American Film Festival and received critical acclaim, holding a 100% rating on the review aggregator site Rotten Tomatoes.

== Plot ==
In a dimly lit basement, a masked surgeon examines a bloody carving fork. Steve Pintolivo (Andrew de Burgh), a recent university graduate, receives a Facebook message from a beautiful woman named Tamara Nolan (Barbara Nedeljakova) inviting him to her Hollywood apartment for a New Year's Eve party.

Over some Colombian marijuana the next day, Steve and his former classmate Derek Urden (Isaac Anderson) discuss a variety of topics including the possible evolution of man and a former right-hand man of Josef Stalin who recently spoke to Derek's religion class about his conversion to Christianity. When the topic of Stalin's underling comes up, Steve quickly changes the subject to Tamara and the invitation. They decide to go to the party but when they arrive, only Tamara is there. However, the two young men soon fall for her charm and are tricked into drinking a cocktail laced with a very powerful sedative that knocks them out within seconds.

When they wake up, Steve and Derek find themselves in a dark basement strapped to an operating table and chair, respectively. Tamara casually walks in holding a syringe and injects Derek with a colorless liquid, killing him instantly. She mentions to Steve that an old man used to live there. A flashback to one year prior and Steve, dressed in a trench coat and holding a knife in his hand, sits on his bed berating Andrei Dzagoev (Harwood Gordon), a former underling of Stalin for murdering his grandfather Ruslan Voronin, a rebel leader, in the Second World War.

Back in the present, Tamara explains that Andrei was her husband and the only man who ever truly loved her. She proceeds to put on surgeon scrubs, then stabs Steve with a carving fork, murdering him. Later that night, Tamara sits in her car, texts a friend, then drives away.

== Cast ==
- Barbara Nedeljakova as Tamara Nolan
- Andrew de Burgh as Steve Pintolivo
- Isaac Anderson as Derek Urden
- Harwood Gordon as Andrei Dzagoev

== Marketing ==
A theatrical trailer was released on March 25, 2015. A short story version was released on February 28, 2017.

== Reception ==
The film received critical acclaim, holding a 100% rating on the review aggregator site Rotten Tomatoes. Starburst film critic Ryan Pollard gave the film a 7 out of 10 and noted that the film "succeeds in putting a new spin on the revenge genre by managing to be effective and atmospheric for the most part, and getting the best out of Barbara Nedeljakova." Felix Vasquez of Cinema Crazed commended the film, stating "Director de Burgh is very good at delivering the gut punch with a surprise twist that unfolds within a twist. He shows a real knack for building suspense and keeping ambiguity a priority in unfolding his narrative. The performances really help “Just One Drink” packing some really great turns, including from Nedeljakova, who presents dimensions that she manages to convey in only eighteen minutes." Dennis Schwartz of Ozus' World Movie Reviews gave the film a B− and noted that "The knockout film is too short to do more than provide a fine eerie atmosphere for its femme fatale story." Staci Layne Wilson of Dread Central praised the film, stating that "The short is well-acted, the dialogue is up to par, here’s gore galore, and it’s intriguing enough to turn into a feature." Anton Bitel of Eye For Film gave the film a three and a half out of five and commended the film's "involving narrative structure."
