= Schaal, Arkansas =

Schaal
- unincorporated community
- Location within the state of Arkansas
- Coordinates: 33°49′34″N 93°57′40″W
- Country: United States
- State: Arkansas
- County: Howard
- Elevation: 305 ft (93 m)
- Time zone: UTC-6 (Central (CST))
  - Summer (DST): UTC-5 (CDT)
- GNIS feature ID: 67104

Schaal is an unincorporated community in Howard County, Arkansas, United States. It is located near Mineral Springs and Nashville, Arkansas.

Former U.S. Surgeon General Joycelyn Elders was born in Schaal.
