= Sally Menke =

American film editor (1953–2010)

- Born: Sally JoAnne Menke; December 17, 1953; Mineola, New York, U.S.
- Died: September 27, 2010 (aged 56); Los Angeles, California, U.S.
- Occupation: Film editor
- Years active: 1980–2010
- Spouse: Dean Parisot (m. 1986)
- Children: 2

Sally JoAnne Menke (December 17, 1953 – September 27, 2010) was an American film editor, who worked in cinema and television. Over the span of her 30-year career in film, she accumulated more than 20 feature film credits.

She had a long-time collaboration with director Quentin Tarantino, and edited all of his films until her death in 2010. Menke was nominated for the Academy Award for Best Film Editing for Pulp Fiction and Inglourious Basterds. She also received three British Academy Film Award nominations for her work on Tarantino's Kill Bill, Pulp Fiction and Inglourious Bastards.

She was nominated 25 times for several different awards, and won 12 in her thirty-year career.

== Early life ==
Menke was born in Mineola, New York, to Charlotte Menke, a teacher, and Dr. Warren Wells Menke, a management professor at Clemson University. She attended P.K. Yonge Developmental Research School in Gainesville, Florida, and graduated in 1972. She would then move back to New York and study at New York University's Tisch School of the Arts Film Program in 1977, graduating with a Bachelor of Arts degree in Film.

== Career ==
Menke edited documentaries for CBS in her early career. The first feature she edited after graduating was Cold Feet, a 1983 comedy. She received more film work in the 1990s, working on films such as Teenage Mutant Ninja Turtles, Heaven & Earth and Mulholland Falls.

In 1992, Menke met Quentin Tarantino when he was holding interviews for an editor. "A cheap one", she once recalled, as this would be his debut feature-length film. Tarantino sent her the script for Reservoir Dogs and she said that she thought it was "amazing". Menke was hiking in Canada when she learned she got the job. After Tarantino and Menke collaborated for Reservoir Dogs, she edited every single one of his films after that up until her death: a total of eight films. Tarantino summarized their working relationship in 2007, saying that "The best collaborations are the director–editor teams, where they can finish each other's sentences", and that Menke was his "only, truly genuine collaborator". Together, they developed their signature style of dialogue-driven, slow-cut scenes composed with fast-cut action scenes.

She was selected as a member of the American Cinema Editors. On the Motion Picture Editors Guild 2012 listing of the 75 best-edited films of all time, Pulp Fiction was listed 18th.

Menke's final editing credit was on the film Peacock, a thriller released in 2010, directed by Michael Lander.

== Personal life ==
Menke married film and television director Dean Parisot in 1986. Like Menke, he also graduated from New York University's Tisch School of the Arts. The couple had two children, Lucas and Isabella.

== Death ==
Menke went hiking on the morning of September 27, 2010, with a friend and her dog. After about an hour, her friend left because she started to feel unwell due to the heat. When Menke didn't return home, her friends notified the police. Search dogs, a Los Angeles Police Department helicopter, and patrol officers spent hours searching Griffith Park for her. Her locked car was found in a parking lot at the park. On September 28, 2010, Menke's body was discovered at the bottom of a ravine near the 5600 block of Green Oak Drive. Her dog was found alive, sitting beside her body. The coroner later determined that Menke's death was heat-related, as temperatures had reached 113 °F (45 °C) in downtown Los Angeles on the day she died.

== Filmography ==
Menke's feature film credits as editor are tabulated below. She has two additional credits for editing television documentaries: Hans Bethe: Prophet of Energy (1980) and The Congress (1988).

Year	Film	Director	Other notes
1983	Cold Feet	Bruce van Dusen	
1990	Teenage Mutant Ninja Turtles	Steve Barron	
1991	The Search for Signs of Intelligent Life in the Universe	John Bailey	
1992	Reservoir Dogs	Quentin Tarantino	20/20 Awards for Best Film Editing; Nominated – Circuit Community Award for Best Film Editing
1993	Heaven & Earth	Oliver Stone	
1994	Pulp Fiction	Quentin Tarantino	Circuit Community Award for Best Editing; Nominated – Academy Award for Best Film Editing; Nominated – ACE Eddie for Best Edited Feature Film – Dramatic; Nominated – BAFTA Award for Best Editing
1995	Four Rooms	Quentin Tarantino	Segment: "The Man from Hollywood"
1996	Mulholland Falls	Lee Tamahori	
1997	Nightwatch	Ole Bornedal	
1997	Jackie Brown	Quentin Tarantino	
2000	All the Pretty Horses	Billy Bob Thornton	
2001	Daddy and Them	Billy Bob Thornton	
2003	Kill Bill: Volume 1	Quentin Tarantino	Las Vegas Film Critics Society Award for Best Editing; San Diego Film Critics Society Award for Best Editing; Nominated – BAFTA Award for Best Editing; Nominated – Phoenix Film Critics Society Award for Best Editing; Nominated – ACE Eddie for Best Edited Feature Film – Dramatic; Nominated – Online Film Critics Society Award for Best Editing; Nominated – American Cinema Editors for Best Editing; Nominated – Awards Circuit Community Awards
2004	Kill Bill: Volume 2	Quentin Tarantino	Las Vegas Film Critics Society Award for Best Editing; San Diego Film Critics Society Award for Best Editing; Nominated – BAFTA Award for Best Editing; Nominated – Phoenix Film Critics Society Award for Best Editing; Nominated – ACE Eddie for Best Edited Feature Film – Dramatic; Nominated – Online Film Critics Society Award for Best Editing; Nominated – American Cinema Editors for Best Editing; Nominated – Awards Circuit Community Awards
2004	Kill Bill: The Whole Bloody Affair	Quentin Tarantino	
2004	The Cutting Edge: The Magic of Movie Editing	Wendy Apple	Self appearance
2007	Death Proof	Quentin Tarantino	Nominated – Italian Online Movie Award for Best Film Editing
2009	Inglourious Basterds	Quentin Tarantino	Nominated – Academy Award for Best Film Editing; Nominated – BAFTA Award for Best Editing; Nominated – Broadcast Film Critics Association Award Best Editing; Nominated – Online Film Critics Society Award for Best Editing
2010	Peacock	Michael Lander	

== Awards and nominations ==
- 1995 – Pulp Fiction (nominated) – Academy Award – "Best Film Editing"
- 1995 – Pulp Fiction (nominated) – American Cinema Editors ACE Eddie Award – "Best Edited Feature Film"
- 1995 – Pulp Fiction (nominated) – BAFTA Film Award – "Best Editing"
- 2003 – Kill Bill: Volume 1 (won) – San Diego Film Critics Society Awards – "Best Editing"
- 2004 – Kill Bill: Volume 1 (nominated) – BAFTA Film Award – "Best Editing"
- 2004 – Kill Bill: Volume 1 (won) – Las Vegas Film Critics Society Awards – Sierra Award for "Best Editing"
- 2005 – Kill Bill: Volume 2 (nominated) – American Cinema Editors ACE Eddie Award – "Best Edited Feature Film (Dramatic)"
- 2005 – Kill Bill: Volume 2 (nominated) – Online Film Critics Society OFCS Award – "Best Editing"
- 2010 – Inglourious Basterds (nominated) – Academy Award – "Best Film Editing"
