= Richard Albert (composer) =

German composer and songwriter (born 1983)

Richard Albert is a German composer and songwriter.

== Early life and music ==
Richard Albert is a self taught musician, he studied computer sciences and communication sciences at the RWTH Aachen University from 2004 to 2010. He made his debut as a film composer for the short film Sachliche Romanze in 2007. With the web-series Hell's Kitty he started working for various production companies in the USA. Richard Albert works frequently with writer/director and musician Nicholas Tana. Richard mainly is active in the indie-horror genre.

== Feature films ==
- 2016: Losing Touch
- 2016: Sticky: A (Self) Love Story
- 2016: The Last Night Inn
- 2018: Hell's Kitty
- 2018: Hide in the Light
- 2019: The Bone Box

== Awards ==
- 2016: The Marshall Hawkins Awards – Best Musical Score – Feature (nominated)
- 2016: German Film Music Award, Category "New talent" (nominated)
- 2018: American Tracks Music Award, Category "Best song for a film"
- 2019: American Tracks Music Award, Category "Best film score" (semi-finalist)
- 2019: Paris Art and Movie Awards, Category "Best Soundtrack Song" (nominated)
- 2019: Jerry Goldsmith Award, Category "Best Soundtrack Song" (nominated)
- 2023: Tracks Music Awards, Category "Best Score for a film of the month"
