= James Hyde (actor) =

American actor (born 1962)

- Born: October 9, 1962 (age 63); Lancaster, Ohio, U.S.
- Occupations: Actor, model, dancer
- Height: 1.85 m (6 ft 1 in)
- Spouse: Sue-Ling Garcia (m. 1994)
- Children: 1

James Robert Hyde (born October 9, 1962) is an American actor, dancer, and former fashion model known for his work on television soap opera Passions and Mexican drama Monarca. He has also worked as a realtor for Pacific Union Los Angeles. He was born and raised in Lancaster, Ohio. Hyde and his wife, Sue-Ling Garcia, were married in 1994 and they have a son, James Moses, born in 2004.

== Biography ==
Hyde had roles in the films The Blackout and Let's Talk About Sex. The Blackout has not yet been released in the US.

He won an open casting call competition for Sunset Beach in 1996 and appeared in the promos for the show. He was cast for the recurring role of "Neil" on the television series Another World in 1997. He also had a short stint as "Liam" on the television series As the World Turns in 1999.

Hyde was picked as a dancer for British new wave band Dead or Alive, which was fronted by singer Pete Burns. Hyde toured in Japan and the US with the band in 1987, 1989 and 1990. After leaving the army. He can be seen as one of the two dancers in the concert film Rip It Up Live, which was filmed at two of their Japanese concerts, and released on VHS in 1988. Additionally, Hyde appeared in Dead or Alive's music videos for Turn Around & Count 2 Ten, Come Home With Me Baby and Your Sweetness is Your Weakness.

He also appeared in a minor role on the short-lived TV series, Mortal Kombat Conquest as a friend of Taja's, in the episode titled "Undying Dream". For ten years, he played the role of "Sam," the town sheriff on the daytime serial Passions, first on NBC and, later, on DirecTV, until the show's cancellation. In 2002, while starring on Passions, Hyde appeared on the cover of Playgirl magazine, posing for a non-nude underwear pictorial to promote the show.

From 2019 to 2021, Hyde played "Martin" on the Mexican drama Monarca, a role he won despite lacking fluency in Spanish. In 2022, he also appeared in the telenovela La Reina Del Sur. That same year, he returned to daytime television in the role of Jeremy Stark on The Young and the Restless.

== Filmography ==
Year	Title	Role	Notes
1996	As the World Turns	Liam #1	TV series
1997	The Blackout		Uncredited
1997	Another World	Neil Johanssen	5 episodes
1998	Sex and the City	Brad Fox	Episode: "Models and Mortals"
1998	Let's Talk About Sex	Scott 'Booty Call Guy'	
1999–2008	Passions	Sam Bennett	244 episodes
2004–2012	CSI: Crime Scene Investigation	Barry Sloan / Mike Trent	2 episodes
2010	Guns, Drugs and Dirty Money	Hitman	
2010	Beautysleep Symphony	Bryce	
2013	Ghost Forest	Bryce Wilder	
2020	Crazy, Rich and Deadly	Leonard	
2020	Natural Disasters	Andrew	
2021	Dutch	Anthony Jacobs	
2022	La Reina del Sur	Mafioso	4 episodes
2022–2023	The Young and the Restless	Jeremy Stark	
2024	The Seductress from Hell	Jeffrey Delap	
