= Barbara Nedeljáková =

Slovak actress

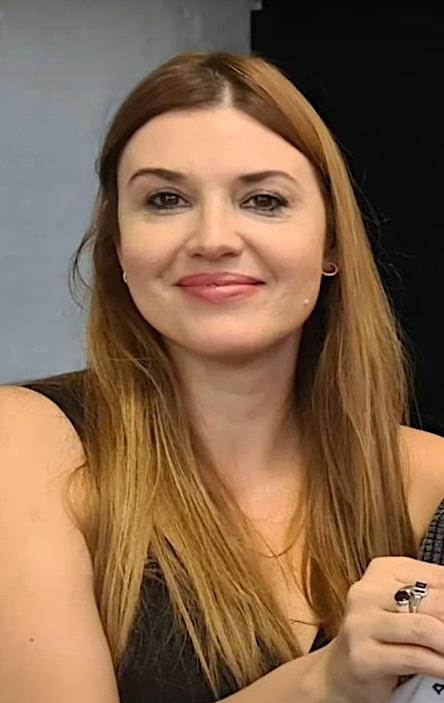
- Nedeljáková at London Film and Comic Con 2022
- Born: May 16, 1979 (age 46); Banská Bystrica, Czechoslovakia
- Occupation: Actress
- Years active: 2002–present
- Parent(s): Pavol Nedeljak, Helena Bestakova Nedeljakova

Barbara Nedeljáková (born May 16, 1979) is a Slovak actress who is best known for her role as Natalya in the 2005 horror film Hostel.

== Early life ==
Nedeljáková was born in Banská Bystrica. She originally wanted to study acting, but instead studied Jewelry design. Her first role was as Geppetto in a stage production of Pinocchio when she was 10.

== Personal life ==
Following the shooting of Hostel, Nedeljáková was briefly in a relationship with the film's director Eli Roth. Since 2006, she resides in Los Angeles.

== Filmography ==
=== Film ===
Year	Title	Role	Other notes
2003	Shanghai Knights	Debutante #3	Minor role
2005	Doom	Girl at Bar (uncredited)	Minor role
2005	Hostel	Natalya	Starring role
2007	Hostel: Part II	Natalya (flashback)	Minor role
2010	Pimp	Petra	Starring role
2010	Isle of Dogs	Nadia	Starring role
2010	Ashes	Maya Ehrlich	Starring role
2011	Children of the Corn: Genesis	Helen	Starring role
2011	The Hike	Torri	Starring role
2012	Strippers vs Werewolves	Raven	Starring role
2013	The Winner 3D	Debbie Brook	Starring role
2015	Whispers	Sasha	Starring role
2015	L.A. Slasher	Scream Queen	Minor role
2015	Just One Drink	Tamara Nolan	Starring role
2016	DaZe: Vol. Too (sic) - NonSeNse	Foreign Girl 1 & 2	Minor role
2017	The Lycans	Ana	Minor role
2020	Sky Sharks	Angelique	Starring role
2020	City Limits	Diana	

=== Television ===
Year	Title	Role	Notes
2001	Cerní andelé	Veronika	Episode: "Help for You"
2001	Verní abonenti	Hanka	TV film
2013	Crossing Lines	Marina Novek	Episode: "Desperation & Desperados"
2014	Hell's Kitty	Natalya	Episode: "Valentine's Day Massacre"
2018	Blue Code	Hamová	Episode: "Pohled do zrcadla"
