= Bianca Ryan discography =

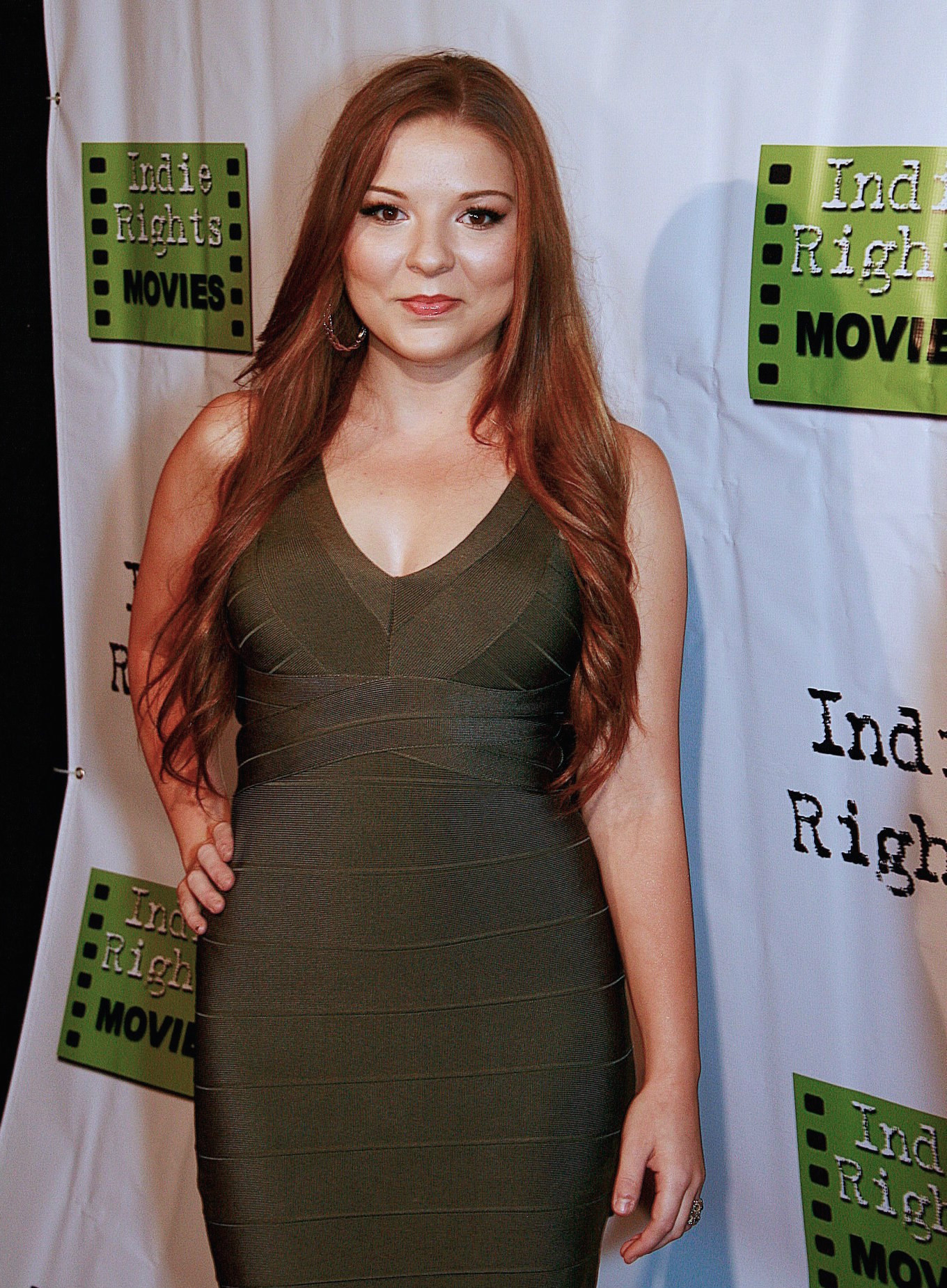
- Ryan at the 2014 premiere of We Are Kings, Los Angeles, California, September 21, 2014
- Studio albums: 1
- EPs: 2
- Compilation albums: 1
- Singles: 8
- Music videos: 7

Bianca Ryan's discography consists of one studio album, two extended plays, seven singles and six music videos. Her debut album Bianca Ryan was released on 14 November 2006 by Syco Music. It was followed by two holiday EPs, Christmas Everyday! (2006) and True Meaning of Christmas (2009). The latter was released by recording label Music Forever. In August 2010, she recorded a single inspired by the film The Twilight Saga: New Moon titled "In My Head". Between 2014 and 2015 she released three more singles: a cover of John Legend's "All of Me", "Broken Down House" and "Alice".

Debut album Bianca Ryan sold over 200,000 copies worldwide and peaked number 34 in Ireland. The single "Why Couldn't It Be Christmas Every Day?" entered the Dutch charts. Ryan was signed to Syco/Columbia Records between 2006 and 2008 and then the indie labels Music Forever and Turned in Music before forming her label in 2015.

== Albums ==
=== Studio albums ===
Albums
Year	Album	Peak chart positions						Sales
Year	Album	US	AUT	GER	IRE	NLD	SWI	Sales
Bianca Ryan	Released: November 14, 2006; Label: SYCOmusic/Columbia	57	46	45	34	38	28	Worldwide: 200,000

=== Compilation albums ===
- Bianca Ryan / Christmas Everyday! (2006)

== Extended plays ==
List of extended plays, with track listings.
Title	EP details
Christmas Everyday!	Released: December 5, 2006; Label: SYCOmusic/Columbia; Format: CD, digital download; Track listing: 1. "Why Couldn't It Be Christmas Every Day?"; 2. "Someday at Christmas"; 3. "Home on Christmas Day"; 4. "Santa Claus Is Coming to Town"; 5. "O Holy Night"
True Meaning of Christmas	Released: November 3, 2009; Label: Music Forever; Format: CD, digital download; Track listing: 1. "The Christmas Song"; 2. "If You Believe"; 3. "Have Yourself a Merry Little Christmas"; 4. "True Meaning of Christmas" (featuring Brent Jones); 5. "When Christmas Comes to Town"

== Singles ==
Singles
Year	Single	Chart positions		Album
Year	Single	NLD Top 40	NLD Top 100	Album
2006	"You Light Up My Life"	—	—	Bianca Ryan
2006	"Why Couldn't It Be Christmas Every Day?"	15	32	Christmas Everyday!
2007	"That's Not Me"	—	—	Non-album singles
2010	"In My Head"	—	—	Non-album singles
2014	"All of Me"	—	—	Non-album singles
2014	"Broken Down House"	—	—	We Are Kings: The Official Movie Soundtrack
2015	"Alice"	—	—	Non-album singles
2018	"Remember"	—	—	Non-album singles

== Music videos ==
Music videos
Year	Title	Artist	Notes
2006	"You Light Up My Life"	Bianca Ryan	Released: November 2006
2006	"Why Couldn't It Be Christmas Every Day?"	Bianca Ryan	Released: December 2006
2010	"About to Fall"	The Wrecking	Released: September 8, 2010
2014	"All of Me"	Bianca Ryan	Released: March 3, 2014
2014	"Broken Down House"	Bianca Ryan	Released: November 6, 2014
2015	"Alice"	Bianca Ryan	Released: May 26, 2015
2018	"Remember"	Bianca Ryan	Released: May 18, 2018
