= So Much For Love =

Studio album by The Wrecking
- Released: August 21, 2012
- Studio: The Halo, Windham, Maine
- Genre: Rock, alternative rock, pop country
- Length: 52:38
- Label: Chosen
- Producer: Karl Anderson, Dustin Burnett

The Wrecking chronology
A New Abolition (2008)	So Much For Love (2012)

Singles from So Much For Love
- 1. "View from the Top" Released: July 22, 2011; 2. "Tidal Wave" Released: February 14, 2012

So Much For Love is the second studio album by The Wrecking, and the album released on August 21, 2012 by Chosen Records. The album was produced by Karl Anderson and Dustin Burnett. The album with the lone exception of "Glorious" was produced, recorded, and mixed by Dustin Burnett at The Halo in Windham, Maine. (Note: According to the inner liner notes of the album.) The song "Glorious" was produced by Karl Anderson with guest vocals by Georgia Noonan, Sarah Nickerson, and Alyssa Carrol. The album was mastered by Adam Ayan at Gateway Mastering Studios in Portland, Maine, and the package design is by Stephen Gilbert and Victoria Richland.

== Critical reception ==
Professional ratings
Review scores
Source	Rating
CCM Magazine	4/5 stars
Christian Music Zine	4.5/5 stars
Christianity Today	2/5 stars
Indie Vision Music	4/5 stars
Jesus Freak Hideout	3.5/5 stars
New Release Tuesday	4.5/5 stars 4/5 stars

CCM Magazine's Andy Argyrakis said "for its second national long player, Portland, Maine's The Wrecking turns up the aggression level yet another notch to make an impressive splash in the modern rock scene...the guys turn in a crisp and crunchy guitar-centered set that's just as alluring on the lyrical end. Topics like brokeness and recovery couldn't be more timely, though there's always the eternal perspective in tow." CCM Magazine compared the band to the likes of Needtobreathe, Augustana and Abandon, and the We Like song as being "Fire".

Christian Music Zine's Joshua Andre said "with singles 'View From the Top' and 'About to Fall' gaining momentum and traction for both of the ingenious music videos and relevant everyday messages; it is clear that it'll be a matter of time before a major record label deal is given to these guys. With an unashamed faith as the backbone for all members, even one listen from this remarkable album is more than enough to hear that this smart and slick musical production coupled with heartfelt and honest lyrics and a passion and hunger for God; is a breath of fresh air in the CCM and mainstream music industry! I would gladly repeat So Much For Love over and over- it speaks volumes about God and this road called 'life'!" In addition, Andre wrote "So Much For Love is one of my favourite pop albums this year, and on a day where Tenth Avenue North, Chris August and Owl City all release new albums, The Wrecking have created an album that could rival any one of the aforementioned artists! Full of double meanings that could create a spike in the sales in the mainstream charts; this album is a memorable entry in 2012! Well done guys, hope you have more exposure in the Christian and the mainstream market! Hats off to producer Dustin Burnett as well!" The favourite tracks according to the reviewer are the following: Electricity, Tidal Wave, Gravity, Glorious, View From the Top, Fighting For Something, Symphony of the Broken Hearted.

Christianity Today's Joel Oliphint said, "The Wrecking's first album, A New Abolition, was all over the map stylistically, incorporating worship songs, hip-hop, and even a cover of Peter Gabriel's 'In Your Eyes.' It didn't always work, but at least it kept you guessing. So Much for Love, on the other hand, is 14 tracks of consistently normal, predictable pop rock, with verses that only exist to forecast fist-pumping choruses. The slick sound recently scored the band a spot on Showtime series The Big C, and the formula will likely serve The Wrecking well on the radio. But it makes for a humdrum listen." Christianity Today said the top song was "View from the Top".

Indie Vision Music's Jonathan Andre said "The Wrecking's second full-length studio album is a collision of hope and pain as the band gives listeners the theme of longing and searching for hope and fulfilment, all the while pointing to Christ for the answer to our problems. A mixture of ballads and rocking melodies that awakens the inner rock enthusiast, So Much for Love was a gem to listen to, bringing a breath of air into a Christian market surrounded by the general CCM trend." Furthermore, Andre wrote that "The Wrecking's sophomore effort cannot be any better, with a conglomeration of lyrical masterpieces as we are met with a hope threaded through each song, pondering the Maker of the universe and His unending love for His creation." Andre surmised that "with a refreshing sound not heard in the CCM industry since Third Day’s Revelation, So Much For Love tackles themes otherwise purposely missed in the 'Christian circle'. Incorporating worship with rock, The Wrecking have shown to be a strength, and with buzz in both the mainstream and Christian industry, this album is almost certain to propel their career as they show everyone their faith and how it is intricately a part of their music. Well done The Wrecking for one of the most satisfying experiences of 2012!" Indie Vision Music said the band is recommended if you like the following band: Building 429, The Afters, VOTA and Hawk Nelson.

Jesus Freak Hideout's Roger Gelwicks said that "even though The Wrecking has been around since 2007, it's only been recently that they've put their best foot forward. For clarifying background information, the fact that So Much For Love is finally released is astonishing in itself; delayed for months and months, The Wrecking has filled in the gaps with various EPs in the meantime. But with a limited release last February, this August finds the fourteen track project So Much For Love getting the grand release it deserves." Additionally, Gelwicks wrote "as far as a pop rock venture, The Wrecking has continued to set a relatively high standard for the genre with So Much For Love, and it's good clean fun all the way around that's a little hard to argue with. Certainly much further along than from their 2007 A New Abolition, The Wrecking has quite a bit of appeal attached to their approach, even if not every track leaps out of the norm, and most will find something to like about So Much For Love's efforts. Hopefully listeners won't have to wait as long for The Wrecking's next release, as they're certainly one of the better pop rock bands active in the circuit, and that doesn't look to change anytime soon."

Jesus Freak Hideout's Wayne Myatt said "The Wrecking has provided a welcome collection of songs that are an enjoyment to listen to which should generate new fans (like this reviewer), and should easily satisfy fans of bands like The Afters and Sanctus Real."

New Release Tuesday's Jonathan Francesco said "The Wrecking have quietly simmered on the back-burner of the industry for quite a few years now, scoring a slew of moderately successful radio hits but never truly establishing themselves as big players. Now, a long-awaited new full-length album is finally upon us and So Much For Love is filled to capacity with light rock goodness." Plus, Francesco wrote that "So Much for Love proves to be a strong album from start to finish. It likely won't find it's [sic] way onto too many best-of lists come year's end (primarily because the band still seems to fly comfortably under the radar), but it's a strong and memorable entry into the band's growing catalogue."

New Release Tuesday's Jay Wright said that "there aren't many albums that are my favorite at first listen, but The Wrecking's So Much For Love is one of those albums! For one, it's not often you hear a totally Christ-centered rock band such as you will hear in this band. Secondly, their melodies are captivating and their rock is inspiring. It's a perfect balance between worship and energetic, hard rock. I hope to see The Wrecking take home an award for this fantastic project!"

== Track listing ==
So Much For Love
No.	Title	Writer(s)	Length
1.	"Fire"	Dustin Burnett, The Wrecking	2:52
2.	"Let Everything Sing"	Burnett, The Wrecking	3:11
3.	"Electricity"	Burnett, The Wrecking	3:57
4.	"Tidal Wave"	Burnett, The Wrecking	3:18
5.	"Gravity"	Burnett, The Wrecking	3:56
6.	"The Antidote"	Burnett, The Wrecking	4:12
7.	"Glorious (feat. Georgia Noonan, Sarah Nickerson, and Alyssa Carrol)"	The Wrecking	3:59
8.	"View from the Top"	Burnett, The Wrecking	3:44
9.	"Life in Reverse"	Burnett, The Wrecking	3:38
10.	"About to Fall"	Burnett, The Wrecking	3:44
11.	"Fighting for Something"	Burnett, The Wrecking	3:54
12.	"Symphony of the Brokenhearted"	Burnett, The Wrecking	3:35
13.	"The Reason"	Burnett, The Wrecking	3:29
14.	"Our Feet Don't Touch the Ground"	Burnett, The Wrecking	5:09
Total length:			52:38

== Charts ==
Chart (2012)	Peak position
US Billboard 200	140
US Top Rock Albums (Billboard)	45
US Top Christian Albums (Billboard)	5
US Independent Albums (Billboard)	21
