= Taylor Ware =

American singer-songwriter (born 1994)

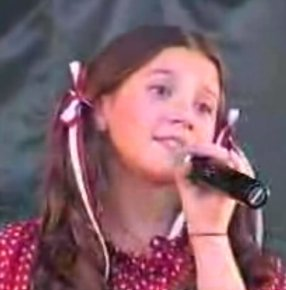
- Taylor Ware in 2007

Background information
- Born: Taylor Marie Ware; September 17, 1994 (age 32)
- Origin: Franklin, Tennessee, U.S.
- Genre: Country
- Occupation: Singer
- Instruments: Violin (from an early age), guitar, vocals

Taylor Marie Ware (born September 17, 1994) is an American singer and yodeler from Franklin, Tennessee.

Before Ware knew how to yodel, she performed at a county fair at age four. Her talent was singing and playing a fiddle. When she was six she decided to sing to seniors, so she started an Adopt-a-Grandparent program. She taught herself to yodel from an audiotape and instruction book when she was seven years old, after going to a music convention with country singer Naomi Hills.

In 2003, at age 9, Ware won $10,000 in the Yahoo! Yodel Challenge and the Sonic Search for a Star. She was later featured in a Yahoo commercial. She also participated in a challenge to beat a Guinness world record. Ware performed on the Grand Ole Opry with Riders in the Sky when she was nine years old.

When Ware was nine, she was given a dog as a gift by Wayne Brady after she appeared on his now defunct television show, The Wayne Brady Show. She named the dog Brady after him.

Ware honed her yodeling skills while taking lessons from country music star Margo Smith who is known worldwide as the Tennessee Yodeler.

At age eleven, she competed on NBC's America's Got Talent and advanced to the final competition (which aired on August 16, 2006). She was one of the top three finalists but she lost to 11-year-old Bianca Ryan, the million-dollar winner and two runners up, The Millers and All That. Ware was an opening act at the Liberty Bowl for singer LeAnn Rimes in Memphis, Tennessee on December 29, 2006, performing the national anthem.

Ware released her self-titled debut album in 2004. In 2007, she released her second album, titled America's Yodeling Sweetheart.

She appeared in an episode of Laguna Beach as herself. She also has appeared in commercials for Beech Bend Park in Bowling Green, Kentucky. Ware's younger brother, Harrison, is also a singer and yodeler. He has performed onstage at the Tennessee State Fair.

== Discography ==
| Year | Album |
|---|---|
| 2004 | Taylor Ware |
| 2007 | America's Yodeling Sweetheart |

Taylor Ware track listing:

1. "He Taught Me How To Yodel"
2. "Take My Brother Please"
3. "Shuffle Song"
4. "Chime Bells"
5. "Grandpa"
6. "All I Ever Wanted Was A Pup"
7. "The Rose"
8. "When You're Down To Nothing"
9. "Cowboy's Sweetheart"
10. "9 to 5"
11. "Save Your Kisses For Me"
12. "Amazing Grace"

America's Yodeling Sweetheart track listing:

1. "How Does She Yodel?"
2. "Yodeling Cowgirls"
3. "Mockingbird Yodel"
4. "Chocolate Ice Cream Cone"
5. "Taylor's Yodel"
6. "Cowboy's Sweetheart"
7. "My Little Lady Who"
8. "Nola"
9. "Hillbilly Fever"
10. "Jesse The Yodeling Cowgirl"
11. "He Taught Me How To Yodel"
12. "Yodel Your Troubles Away"
