= View from the Top (song) =

"View From the Top"

Single by The Wrecking

from the album So Much For Love
- Released: July 22, 2011
- Genre: Christian rock-contemporary-pop rock
- Length: 3:43 (single); 3:44 (album)
- Label: Chosen
- Songwriter(s): Dustin Burnett, The Wrecking
- Producer(s): Dustin Burnett

The Wrecking singles chronology
"In Your Eyes" (2008)	"View From the Top" (2011)	"Tidal Wave" (2012)

"View From the Top" is a song by the Christian rock-contemporary-pop rock band The Wrecking from their second album, So Much For Love. It was digitally released on July 22, 2011, as the first single from the album. The band performed the song live on an episode of The Big C during season 3, episode 3, "Bundle of Joy".

== Background ==
"View From the Top" was produced by Dustin Burnett and written by Dustin Burnett and The Wrecking.

== Critical reception ==
Joshua Andre in Christian Music Zine called the song "full of guitars riffs and electronic effects like out of an Owl City song! The lead radio single packs an energetic punch, and the band’s no nonsense view of no compromise is shown in passionate vocals in the chorus" that are about having a "God is outside time, and His view of the world is a beautiful place where everything makes sense. He has been where we are, and He;s already there where we haven’t been - that should give us comfort to know that we are in the arms of the One who has all control!" Jonathan Andre for Indie Vision Music summed up the song: "The Wrecking show their hunger for God’s grace in 'View From the Top', proclaiming above the grunging guitar that '…I wanna see the view from the top, where Your grace is enough and Your love never stops…' With lead vocalist Douglas Elder sharing his heart of the song, '…[which] is about getting above all the things that hold us back or bring us down. It's about the empowerment that comes from having a proper perspective on the struggles and brokenness of life…’ we are given hope that God uses everything in our lives for His greatness and our good. As we see this bigger picture; our lives become more hopeful as we start to view it from His perspective, from the top as we let His plan for our lives come into fruition." New Release Tuesday's Jay Wright wrote that the song "is a rocker with a fantastic message of seeing our life from God’s eyes".

== Weekly charts ==
Chart (2011)	Peak position
Billboard Christian Rock	24
