= A New Abolition =

Studio album by The Wrecking
- Released: August 19, 2008
- Genre: Christian rock, pop rock
- Length: 42:08
- Label: Chosen
- Producer: Jonathan Wyman

The Wrecking chronology
A New Abolition (2008)	So Much For Love (2012)

Singles from A New Abolition
- 1. "In Your Eyes" Released: June 17, 2008

A New Abolition is the first studio album The Wrecking. It was released on August 19, 2008 by Chosen Records, and was produced by Jonathan Wyman.

== Critical reception ==
Professional ratings
Review scores
Source	Rating
AllMusic	4/5 stars
Alternative Addiction	3/5 stars
Jesus Freak Hideout	4/5 stars

Reviews of A New Abolition were generally positive. Jared Johnson of AllMusic praised the album’s distinctive modern worship sound and called it a creative and satisfying release Alternative Addiction noted it was "an extremely competent if unspectacular pop rock major label debut."

== Track listing ==
Tracklist
No.	Title	Writer(s)	Length
1.	"Inside"	Darren Elder	3:13
2.	"Sights and Sounds"	Darren Elder	3:25
3.	"In Your Eyes"	Peter Gabriel	3:59
4.	"The Deep"	Darren Elder	3:15
5.	"You Remain"	Darren Elder	3:51
6.	"Burn the Bridges"	Darren Elder	4:07
7.	"Breakthrough"	Darren Elder	3:40
8.	"The Reel to Real"	Darren Elder	2:40
9.	"The New Jerusalem"	Darren Elder	4:25
10.	"March On"	Darren Elder	5:00
11.	"The Waiting"	Darren Elder	3:53
Total length:			42:08

== Personnel ==
- Doug Elder - vocals, guitar
- Darren Elder - drums
- Karl Anderson - keys, bass guitar, backing vocals
- Chris James - guitar

== Charts ==
=== Album ===
Chart (2012)	Peak position
US Top Christian Albums (Billboard)	32
US Heatseekers Albums (Billboard)	35
