= Bianca Ryan (album) =

Studio album by Bianca Ryan
- Released: November 14, 2006
- Recorded: October 2006
- Studio: Los Angeles, California
- Genre: Pop; gospel; R&B; soul
- Length: 48:10
- Label: Syco; Columbia; Sony BMG
- Producer: Jay Landers; Jaymes Foster; David Foster; Walter Afanasieff; Quiz & Larossi; Emanuel Kiriakou; Robbie Buchanan; Mark Hammond; Julian Bunetta; Jochem van der Saag

Bianca Ryan chronology
Bianca Ryan (2006)	Christmas Everyday! (2007)

Singles from Bianca Ryan
- 1. "You Light Up My Life" Released: November 14, 2006; 2. "Why Couldn't It Be Christmas Every Day?" Released: December 1, 2006

Bianca Ryan is the debut album from America's Got Talent season 1 winner of the same name. Bianca Ryan was part of a five-record deal signed by Ryan and SYCOmusic in 2006, and features cover versions of "The Rose" and "I Believe I Can Fly" and original songs like "I Wish That" and "Pray for a Better Day".

The album debuted at no. 57 on the Billboard top 200 albums chart, selling over 200,000 copies worldwide. It produced two singles, "You Light Up My Life" and "Why Couldn't It Be Christmas Every Day?"

== Album and singles ==
One week after she won America's Got Talent, Bianca Ryan announced on her website that she had flown to New York to meet with representatives from a record label and some of the recording industry's top songwriters. The following month, Ryan was in Los Angeles for the recording sessions. Bianca Ryan was released on November 14, 2006; it debuted and peaked at no. 57 on the Billboard top 200 albums chart.

A video for "You Light Up My Life" also was released in November. "Why Couldn't It Be Christmas Every Day?" was not an official single release by Columbia Records, but radio stations in several countries played the song in 2006 as part of their Christmas-themed programming. The song reached no. 15 on the official Dutch Top 40. A longer remix was included on the promotional EP Christmas Everyday!

== Critical reception ==
Professional ratings
Review scores
Source	Rating
AllMusic	3.5/5 stars

Matt Collar of AllMusic said that the arrangements were "grandiose" for someone of Ryan's age, but they were "more than matched by her truly impressive vocal talent." Los Angeles Daily News reviewer Sandra Barrera wrote that Ryan handled the songs "like the old pro that her big, powerful voice makes you think she is".

== Track listing ==
Bianca Ryan track listing
No.	Title	Writer(s)	Producers	Length
1.	"The Rose"	Amanda McBroom	Quiz & Larossi	3:38
2.	"Awake"	Charlie Midnight, Julian Bunetta	Bunetta	3:53
3.	"I Believe I Can Fly"	R. Kelly	Walter Afanasieff	4:38
4.	"Pray for a Better Day"	Kara DioGuardi, David Foster	Foster, Jochem van der Saag	4:34
5.	"Dream in Color"	April Lang, Shelly Peiken	Emanuel Kiriakou	4:11
6.	"I Wish That"	Diane Warren	Kiriakou	3:59
7.	"And I'm Telling You I'm Not Going"	Tom Eyen, Henry Krieger	Robbie Buchanan	3:53
8.	"Superstar"	Remee, Joe Belmaati, Mich Hansen	Mark Hammond	3:45
9.	"I Will"	Bridget Benenate, Matthew Gerrard, Robert Nevil	Kiriakou	3:45
10.	"Pure and Simple"	Tim Hawes, Pete Kirtley, Alison Clarkson	Quiz & Larossi	4:14
11.	"You Light Up My Life"	Joe Brooks	Quiz & Larossi	3:28
12.	"Why Couldn't It Be Christmas Every Day?"	Jay Landers, Afanasieff	Afanasieff	4:06

Target bonus tracks
No.	Title	Length
13.	"Groovin'" (featuring J-Status)	3:00
14.	"There Is a Love"	3:13

Wal-Mart bonus track
No.	Title	Length
13.	"Awake" (Sunrise Mix)

== Charts ==
Chart performance for Bianca Ryan
Chart (2006)	Peak position
Austrian Albums (Ö3 Austria)	46
German Albums (Offizielle Top 100)	45
Irish Albums (IRMA)	34
Swiss Albums (Schweizer Hitparade)	28
US Billboard 200	57
Chart (2021–2022)	Peak position
Dutch Albums (Album Top 100)	38

== Release history ==
Release history for Bianca Ryan
Continent	Date	Format	Label
North America	November 14, 2006	CD, digital download	Syco Music, Columbia Records
Europe	December 15, 2006	CD, download	Syco, Sony BMG
