= We Are Kings =

- Release poster
- Directed by: Toby Hubner
- Screenplay by: Toby Hubner
- Produced by: Robert Spring; Toby Hubner
- Starring: Sammy Blue; Bianca Ryan; Rita Graham; Jonathon "Boogie" Long; Pryce
- Cinematography: Joshua Sampson
- Edited by: Claire Vandewalle
- Music by: Sammy Blue; Jonathon "Boogie" Long; Bianca Ryan; Rita Graham; Pryce
- Distributed by: Indie Rights
- Release date: September 19, 2014 (Limited)
- Running time: 77 minutes
- Country: United States
- Language: English

We Are Kings is an independent feature film directed by Toby Hubner and starring Sammy Blue, Bianca Ryan, Rita Graham, Jonathon "Boogie" Long and Pryce.

The film was crowdsourced beginning with a Kickstarter campaign. It premiered in Los Angeles, California, on September 19, 2014.

== Plot ==
Mississippi bluesman I. Be King and his wife Lilly eke out a meager living playing music at their "juke club" The Blues Bucket, but they've fallen behind in their lease payments. When the club is repossessed by the bank, the two move into their Winnebago (also called The Blues Bucket), but the stress proves too much for Lilly and a stroke sends her to the hospital. King then heads to Chicago hoping to score the recording deal that he expects will save his wife and their club.

In Chicago, the executive who offered the deal decides instead to dismiss King, calling his music "not commercial enough". King gives up, gets drunk, and passes out in a parking lot and nearly freezes to death. Two homeless musicians, Layla and Dustin, are guided by an angel to save King and, after taking on Sam, a runaway rapper, they begin traveling around the Chicago area, playing impromptu gigs in an effort to raise the money needed to help King get back to Mississippi and make everything right.

Their journey is complicated when police pull over the motor home to take Layla and Sam into custody. Each had been reported missing and felony charges were involved.

== Cast ==
- Sammy Blue as I. Be King
- Bianca Ryan as Layla Knuckles
- Rita Graham as Lilly King
- Jonathon "Boogie" Long as Dustin Ladue
- Pryce as Sam the rapper

== Production ==
Co-producer-writer-director Toby Hubner financed his film under the working title We Be Kings with the help of a Kickstarter campaign that ran for three weeks starting in February 2012. Nearly US$9,000 was pledged, surpassing the goal of $7,500.

Kings was originally to star Chicago blues legend Magic Slim, but Slim fell ill and died just as production was getting started. Blue, once dubbed "the Crown Prince of the Blues" by Muddy Waters, took over the role and "did a remarkable job with little preparation and under tough circumstances." Ryan, the first winner of America's Got Talent, signed on in 2012. Blues vocalist Grana Louise was originally set to co-star as Lilly and Quinn Sullivan was to play Dustin; they were replaced by Graham (formerly of The Raelettes) and Long, respectively.

Still, without Slim, the film was "floundering" and investors backed out. Hubner then caught a break in the form of bonus airline miles and an accompanying credit card. A crew of six people ("a photographer, a sound girl, and four students") captured music and film footage at a strip mall, a motel, a bowling alley and several other locations in places like Normal and El Paso, Illinois. An additional crowdsourcing campaign via Indiegogo helped complete the film.

=== Music ===
The cast members, all working musicians, wrote and performed their own music under the supervision of Blue. The official soundtrack album was released in November 2014.

== Critical reception ==
LA Weekly columnist Chuck Wilson called We Are Kings a "rare ... film about musicians where you actually look forward to the next song." Wilson said Ryan, Long and Pryce are "so bursting with talent that it's impossible to pick a favorite", but felt the finale was "rushed" with "too much triumph, too little emotion". Michael Rechtshaffen wrote in the Los Angeles Times that Hubner's "love letter to the blues" is constantly threatened by the "clunky dramatic staging and discordant emoting" from the "non-actor musicians", but praised the "palpable, soulful authenticity to the musical performances which ultimately draw you in" to a film with its heart "unmistakably in the right place." Life In LA's Shannon Pierce noted a couple of plot holes, but called Kings a "great" film with an ending that "gives you a 'jump for joy' feeling."

== Home video ==
The film's producers plan to include a "special tribute" to Magic Slim for the Blu-ray/DVD release.
