= Jonathon "Boogie" Long =

- Born: Baton Rouge, Louisiana, United States
- Genres: Blues rock
- Occupations: Singer, guitarist, songwriter
- Instruments: Vocals, guitar
- Years active: 2000s–present
- Website: Official website

Jonathon "Boogie" Long is an American blues rock singer, guitarist, and songwriter. His debut album was Jonathon "Boogie" Long & the Blues Revolution (2013), and Long has since issued another six collections. He has shared the stage with B.B. King, ZZ Top, Robert Cray, Joe Bonamassa, Dr. John, Govt Mule, Robert Randolph, Dr. John, Rockin' Dopsie, Monte Montgomery, Ellis Hall, Kenny Neal, Larry Garner, Henry Gray, Lil Ray Neal, and Lou Marini. Long also co-starred in the independent fictional film, We Are Kings.

== Life and career ==
He was born in Baton Rouge, Louisiana, United States. Long was raised in a Southern Baptist community, and became acquainted with the guitar at the age of six, when he attempted to play some gospel songs he had heard at church. His grandfather used to play in church and Long's own father, on his birthday, bought his son his first guitar, when he was around eight years old and formal lessons began shortly thereafter. He performed onstage when aged ten at the local venue, Swamp Mama's, with local musicians including Kenny Neal, Rudy Richard and Lil Ray Neal. Long left school at 14, and with his parents' consent went on tour playing the bass guitar in the backing ensemble for Henry Turner Jr. for two years up to 2005. Following his stint with Turner, Long added to his experience by touring variously with Chris Duarte, Kenny Wayne Shepherd, and Tyree Neal on the Chitlin' Circuit; on the college circuit with 2Hipnotic; and then a spell backing Luther Kent. In 2011, Long was named Guitar Center's 'King of the Blues', in the competition for the number one unsigned blues guitarist in America. Part of the prize package was a studio session with the record producer Pete Anderson. This resulted in the issue of Long's debut EP, The Pete Anderson Sessions. The recording consisted of three original songs, "Bad Karma", "The Dealer" and "Do Right Woman", which were recorded at the Nest Studio in Glendale, California, between October 17 and 23, 2011.

In April 2013, Long self-released his debut album, Jonathon "Boogie" Long & the Blues Revolution, which gave recognition to his then backing ensemble. Long filmed Boogie Blues Magic the same year, an instructional three-DVD set in which he explained fundamental blues guitar styles. Long also co-starred in the independent fictional film, We Are Kings (2014), concerning an elderly couple that owned a juke joint in the Mississippi Delta. Long had supported B.B. King on a four week long tour in 2013. Long was a regular performer at the New Orleans Jazz & Heritage Festival, and has appeared at the Montreal International Jazz Festival. Recordings from three of his New Orleans Jazz & Heritage Festival (Jazzfest) performances have been released on CD.

His 2016 release was Trying to Get There. Jonathon Long was the title of his next studio album, which was issued in 2018 on Wild Heart Records, and was produced by Samantha Fish who runs the record label. Long commented on the arrangement with Fish, "We have the same manager. We've been playing shows together and on the same bill for a long time and we have a lot of respect for each other, work well together. She was getting into entrepreneurship of a record label and I needed some support". It reached a top ten listing in the Billboard Top Blues Albums Chart. In November 2019, Long was inducted into the Louisiana Music Hall of Fame. Parables of a Southern Man, Long's second release on Wild Heart Records was issued on July 2, 2021. Like his previous album, the collection was also produced by Fish. It also reached a top ten listing in the Billboard Top Blues Albums Chart. Since joining Wild Heart Records Long's billing has dropped his nickname of 'Boogie', it was not certain whether this arrangement is permanent. Long's first single was "Savior's Face", a track taken from Parables of a Southern Man.

== Discography ==
=== Albums ===
Year	Title	Record label
2013	Jonathon "Boogie" Long & the Blues Revolution	Self-released
2014	Live at Jazzfest 2014	Munck Music
2016	Live at Jazzfest 2016	Munck Music
2016	Trying to Get There	Louisiana Red Hot Records
2018	Live at Jazzfest 2018	Munck Music
2018	Jonathon Long	Wild Heart Records
2021	Parables of a Southern Man	Wild Heart Records
2026	Courage in the Chaos	Myrical Records
