= Bianca Ryan =

American musician (born 1994)

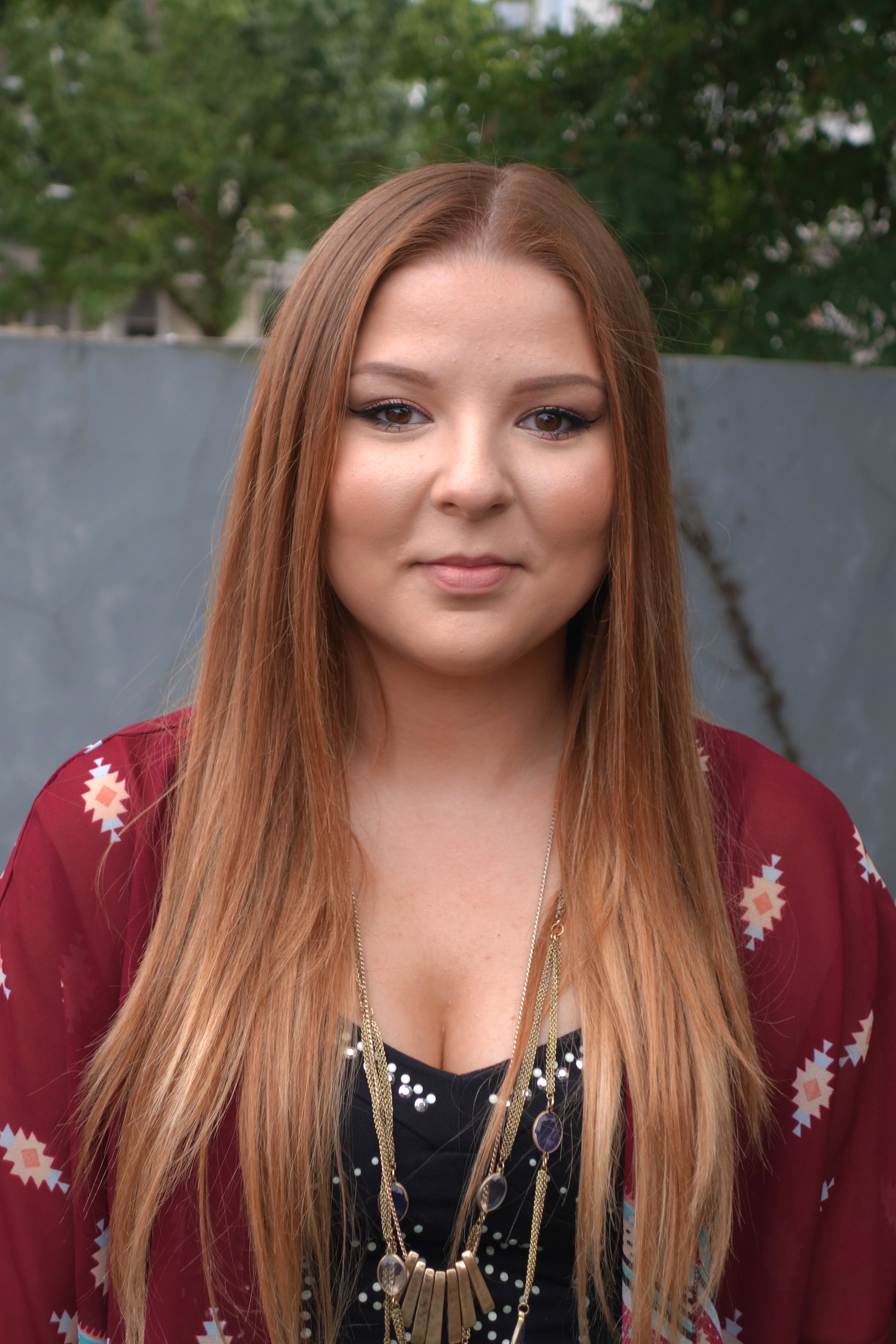
- Bianca Ryan at the Hollystock Music and Arts Festival in Mount Holly, New Jersey, in August 2015

Background information
- Born: Bianca Taylor Ryan; September 1, 1994 (age 32); Ocean City, New Jersey, U.S.
- Genres: Pop; neo soul; R&B
- Occupations: Musician; singer; songwriter
- Instruments: Vocals; guitar; piano
- Years active: 2006–present
- Labels: Syco Music/Columbia; Music Forever; Tuned in Music and Media; Bianca Ryan Records, LLC
- Website: biancaryan.com

Bianca Taylor Ryan (born September 1, 1994) is an American musician, singer and songwriter from Philadelphia, Pennsylvania. Ryan was the first winner of NBC's America's Got Talent at the age of eleven. Singing two Broadway show tunes along the way, Ryan was announced as the winner of season one on August 17, 2006. Her self-titled first album was released later in 2006, followed by two Christmas albums. Two singles followed in 2007 and 2010.

After a break to finish her education, Ryan recorded a cover of the John Legend song "All of Me" and posted the video to her YouTube channel in March 2014. Her original song "Alice" was self-released in May 2015. Following a delay due to health problems, Ryan premiered her single "One Day" in May 2017; since then, she has written and released singles including "Man Down" and "Remember". Her EP The Reintroduction, Pt. 1 was released in January 2019. Following the release of several singles, a second Christmas EP was made available in November 2020, followed by a series of videos made for the holidays.

Ryan has acted in the feature film 12 and Holding (2005) and played the lead role in a music video by The Wrecking in 2010. The independent film We Are Kings premiered in 2014, featuring Ryan as one of two down-on-their-luck teen musicians who are guided by an angel to save an elder bluesman from freezing to death. Ryan co-wrote much of the film's music, and the video for her song "Broken Down House" was released in October.

== Early life ==
Bianca Ryan is the second of five children of Shawn and Janette Ryan, (Note: Ryan has one older brother and one younger brother, and two younger sisters.) who moved from New Jersey to Philadelphia when Bianca was three years old. Her father, a fan of The Rolling Stones, named her after Mick Jagger's ex-wife. (Note: In 2014, when an interviewer joked that "Bianca Ryan" sounded like a fake name, she admitted that she didn't like her name and had considered changing it.) Ryan is "mostly" Irish and calls herself a mix of Japanese, Irish, Italian, German and Cherokee. "I'm basically just America ... the melting pot."

Ryan's singing talent came as something of a surprise to her family, given that she was an award-winning tap dancer as a child. Ryan said she did not even attempt to sing until she was eight years old and started enjoying LeAnn Rimes and country music. Shawn Ryan started sharing his record collection with his daughter, and Bianca "fell in love" with rhythm and blues and soul music. Eventually, she began rehearsing nightly with her father. Ryan convinced him to take her to an audition for Star Search, where her performance of "Think" impressed the judges and shocked her father. "I'd never heard her sing like that." During the Junior Singers competition, Bianca Ryan lost to Spensha Baker. Ryan later won Amateur Kids Night on Showtime at the Apollo.

Ryan has sung the Star-Spangled Banner for several professional sports teams, including the Philadelphia Eagles, the New York Knicks and its Westchester affiliate, and the New York Mets.

== America's Got Talent ==
"And I Am Telling You I'm Not Going"
11-year-old Bianca Ryan auditions for America's Got Talent (season 1), belting out a Broadway show tune to a rousing ovation

In 2006, Ryan learned that American Idol judge Simon Cowell was serving as executive producer for an upcoming competition titled America's Got Talent, and the tryouts in New York City were happening on the same day as a family outing in the city. Ryan almost left without performing when she looked at the other contestants and saw a lady with a beard "probably about, like, two feet long," juggling torches. She decided to stay when her father told her the grand prize was US$1 million. For her televised audition, she chose the Dreamgirls show tune "And I Am Telling You I'm Not Going", surprising the audience and the judges with her powerful voice. The video of her audition performance quickly became popular on YouTube.

For the semi-finals of the show Ryan performed "Piece of My Heart". The judges praised her performance, but they did not think the song was right for Ryan. She rebounded for her finals performance, singing "I Am Changing" (also from Dreamgirls); judge David Hasselhoff called her "the best" in the competition, while Piers Morgan predicted she would win. During the finale results aired on August 17, 2006, 11-year-old Bianca Ryan was announced by emcee Regis Philbin as the winner of season one of America's Got Talent. (Note: Ryan was the show's only female winner, and the only child act to win, until Grace VanderWaal took the top prize for season 11 in 2016. She remains the youngest winner through season 12.)

Ryan made a brief appearance during the show's season two finale in 2007. In a video recorded during Live Nation's Nextfest tour, she wished good luck to the top two finalists.

== Career ==
=== Music ===
==== 2006–2009: Bianca Ryan and holiday albums ====
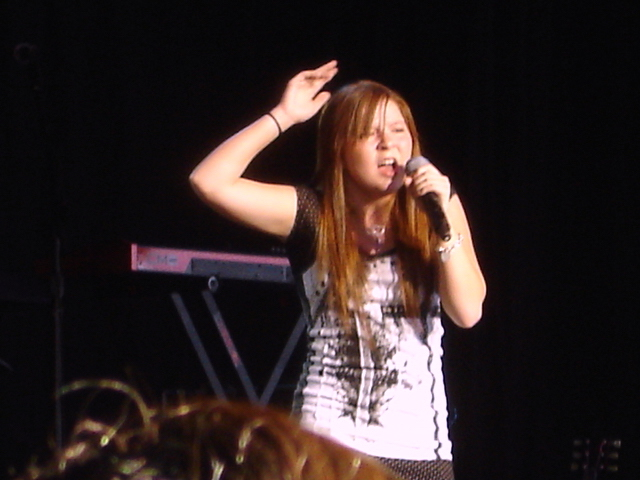
Ryan performing during the Nextfest Tour in July 2007

One week after her victory, Ryan announced on her website that she had flown to New York to meet with representatives from a record label and some of the recording industry's top songwriters. The Northeast Times reported the same day that Ryan met with Grammy Award-winning producer David Foster and was being managed by Peter Rudge.

Ryan signed a five-album record deal with Sycomusic as part of Columbia Records on September 18, 2006. She was the first U.S. artist to sign with SYCOmusic; during the press conference, Simon Cowell called Ryan "potentially one of the best singers I have ever heard in my life." The following month, Ryan was in Los Angeles to record her first CD. The self-titled debut was released on November 14, 2006, featuring cover versions of "The Rose" and "I Believe I Can Fly", and original songs like "I Wish That" and "Pray for a Better Day". Eight days later, the album debuted at No. 57 on the Billboard album charts, showcasing "her gargantuan chops and sweet charm". Matt Collar of AllMusic added that the arrangements were "grandiose" for someone of Ryan's age, but they were "more than matched by her truly impressive vocal talent." Los Angeles Daily News reviewer Sandra Barrera wrote that Ryan handled the songs "like the old pro that her big, powerful voice makes you think she is".

One month later, the EP Christmas Everyday! was released as a promotional giveaway. She then joined several artists in a televised 2006 Christmas performance for President George W. Bush and First Lady Laura Bush at the National Building Museum to benefit the Children's National Medical Center.

Ryan's first concert tour took her across the United States as the special guest artist for Nextfest in 2007. That August, she released the single "That's Not Me".

In 2008, Ryan left SYCOmusic/Columbia Records; she released her second holiday-themed EP, True Meaning of Christmas, on November 3, 2009, on the indie Music Forever label. This second collection, co-written with Anthony Marinelli and Siedah Garrett, included updated versions of "The Christmas Song" and "Have Yourself a Merry Little Christmas"; the title track featured a duet with gospel pop singer Brent Jones.

==== 2010–present: Singles, videos and EPs ====
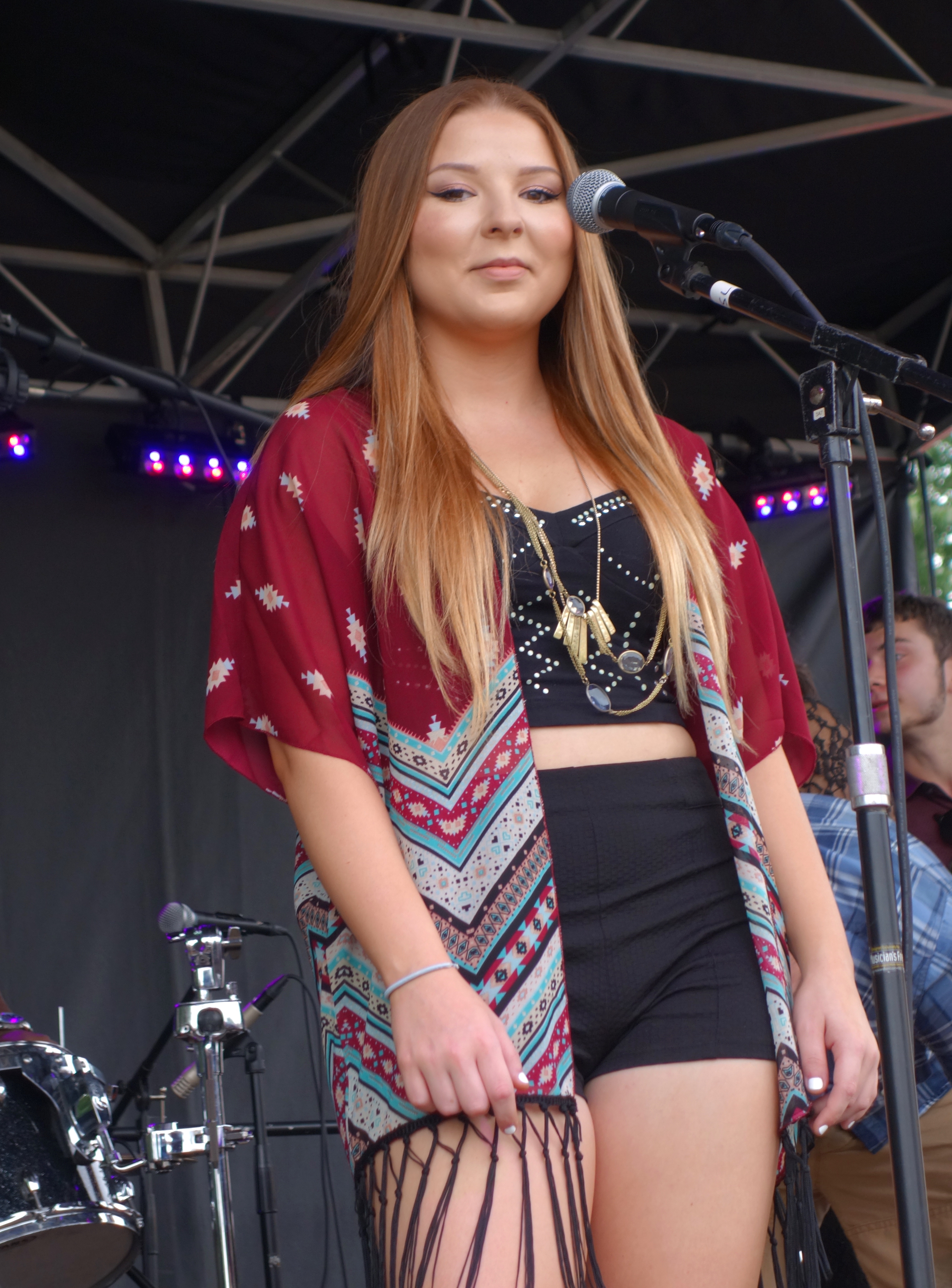
Ryan performs at the 2015 Hollystock Music and Arts Festival in Mount Holly, New Jersey

In 2010, Bianca Ryan wrote and recorded a song inspired by Twilight: New Moon called "In My Head". The single was released digitally on August 21 through the indie label Tuned in Music and Media, followed by performances at Trump Plaza in Atlantic City, New Jersey.

Ryan was asked in October 2012 about the differences between her debut album and her future projects. She said she didn't get to choose what songs went on her first CD, and while the experience she gained by working with people like David Foster and Kara DioGuardi was amazing, "I didn't feel like it was really me. ... You can relate to songs that you write."

Ryan spent much of her teen years out of the spotlight. She explained in 2014 that she had put her career on hold to go back to school even though, as it turned out, she hated high school—besides "a couple of stalkers", she was mostly ignored by other students and didn't make any friends until after school was over. Nevertheless, she "wanted to live a life, and have purpose and things to write about" due to her passion for writing music. Ryan described her musical style as a blend of neo soul, R&B and pop.

Ryan announced in February that she was working with industry veterans like Quincy Jones on a new EP featuring her own work, which she called more "mainstream" than anything she had written before. She started her own record label, Bianca Ryan Records LLC, to promote her artistic freedom as well as make a profit. "I could literally sell 1% of what I would sell with a record company and finally make money off my music to where I can fund other projects".

She also went back to work on her YouTube channel in 2014. Her cover of "All of Me" was uploaded in March.

In 2015, Ryan created a music video for "Alice", an original song she had written years earlier. The video was funded in part by a Kickstarter project and was self-released in May 2015. It features dancer Chloe Lukasiak, who called the video her favorite project since leaving Dance Moms. The single was released via Ryan's own label through iTunes, Google Play and ReverbNation. Her cover of "God Bless the Child" was released on iTunes in July.

Ryan was a featured performer at the Hollystock Music and Arts Festival in Mount Holly, New Jersey, in August 2015. Performances in November included the Macy's Christmas Window unveiling and the 6ABC/Dunkin' Donuts Thanksgiving Parade, both in Philadelphia.

Her plans were put on hold in October 2016 due to health problems that required several surgeries. Her first performance following her recovery was at the Nashville Christmas Parade on December 3. Ryan's single "One Day" was released in May 2017. Two follow-up singles, "What I Gotta Do" and "Man Down", were released in June; "Man Down" was called "the ultimate breakup anthem" by TigerBeat. Also in June, Ryan was the subject of an artist profile produced by Major League Baseball.

Ryan intended to release two EPs in 2017, but her plans were delayed. Instead, she chose to release singles, including "Don't Wanna Come Down" in October, and "Remember" in May 2018, featuring an official video using old family footage.

Live appearances in 2018 included co-headlining the Houpalooza Music Festival on June 16 in Houston, Texas, part of the Women's Empowerment Movement Tour. Nick Cannon was a co-host; performers included Flo Rida, and Paul Anthony of Full Force. Ryan joined season six winner Landau Eugene Murphy Jr. for his Christmas Tour of Champions in December, making several stops in Murphy's native West Virginia.

The Reintroduction, Pt. 1 was released on January 6, 2019; Ryan's single "They Wanna Be Us Now" went on sale one day later. The accompanying video, shot the previous August in Los Angeles, was uploaded on May 1, 2019; it features America's Got Talent alumnus Merrick Hanna as Bully No. 1 and Zoephia Decker-Knealing as young Bianca.

In November 2020, Ryan released the Christmas EP What the World Needs Now Is Love with six songs, including the title track and an updated version of "Why Couldn't it Be Christmas Every Day?" Dance Moms' Lilliana Ketchman returned for a series of music videos created for the holiday season.

==== Return appearances on America's Got Talent ====
In October 2018, Bianca Ryan announced that she would compete in the new spinoff series America's Got Talent: The Champions, taped in advance in Pasadena, California, for broadcast in January 2019, and featuring 50 total winners and finalists from across the Got Talent franchise including Britain, Ukraine and Australia. Ryan was the first act to perform on the premiere episode, singing "Say Something" to a standing ovation. (Note: The same night, Ryan released the studio recording of the song.) Afterward, the judges praised Ryan for overcoming both her setbacks and her nerves; Simon Cowell credited her for the success of the franchise and said he was "thrilled" to see her return. Two acts out of ten made it to the finals: Susan Boyle won judge Mel B's Golden Buzzer, while Ryan finished second in the fan voting to Preacher Lawson.

Ryan was a guest performer during the first live results show of AGT's 14th Season, along with contortionist Sofie Dossi, violinist Brian King Joseph and card magician & season 13 winner Shin Lim. Ryan released her single "Plastic Lovers" the same day.

==== Broadway ====
Ryan sang in the 2017 Broadway production "Home For the Holidays", which ran from November 17 through December 30 at the August Wilson Theatre. Vocal performers included American Idol season 12 winner Candice Glover, The Voice season six winner Josh Kaufman, and Peter and Evynne Hollens. Kaitlyn Bristowe served as host; actor/singer Danny Aiello shared holiday memories.

Reviews were mostly negative; HuffPost writer Michael Giltz called the show a train wreck, and said Ryan's voice was shaky and she appeared uncomfortable on stage. Joe Dziemianowicz of the New York Daily News made the same observation. (Note: Ryan admitted that she was shy and nervous at first, but later grew into the performance.) Ryan's performance invited mixed comparisons to Mariah Carey: Frank Scheck of The Hollywood Reporter called her a "desperate" wannabe; Heather Violanti of Theatre Is Easy offered a similar opinion, though she called Ryan "confident and capable"; and ZEALnyc critic Megan Wrappe said Ryan does Carey proud with "a voice that fluctuates amazingly between breathy and a soulful powerhouse". Scott Harrah of StageZine noted Ryan's occasional pitch problems and overdone hand gestures, but praised her "impressive vocals".

=== Acting ===
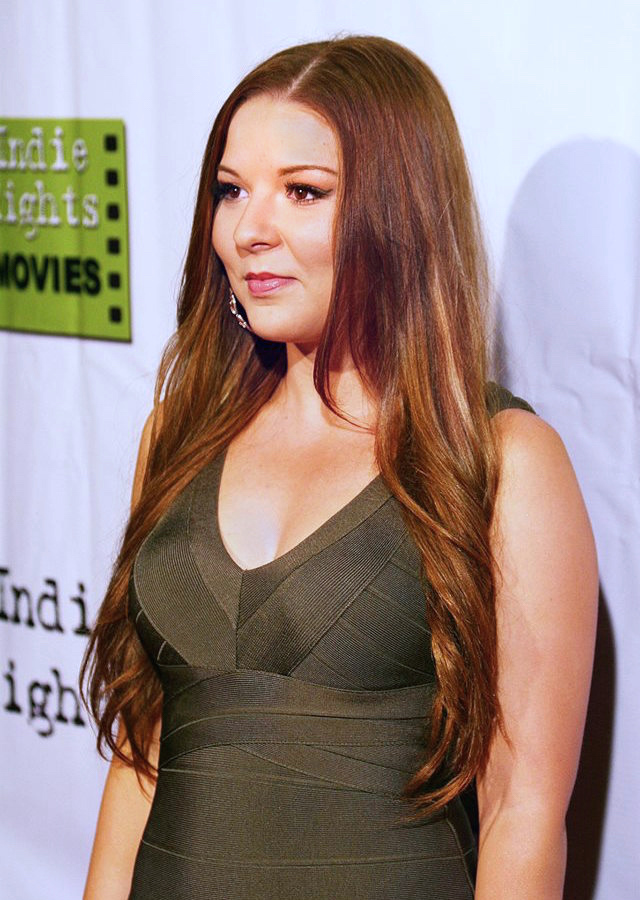
Ryan at the 2014 premiere of We Are Kings, her first co-starring role in a feature film

Ryan made several early attempts at an acting career, trying out unsuccessfully for such projects as Camp Rock and Hannah Montana. She made her debut in a walk-off appearance in the 2005 film 12 and Holding; her character is shown at a school function singing the final line of "Oh! Susanna", thanking the audience, and leaving the stage. She returned to acting five years later, playing the lead role in the music video for "About to Fall" by The Wrecking.

In 2012, Ryan joined the cast of We Are Kings, an independent, crowdsourced feature film. She portrayed one of two homeless musicians who join up with a runaway rapper to help an elder bluesman raise the money he needs to save his comatose wife and their repossessed blues club. Ryan and her co-stars wrote their own original songs for We Are Kings. Her first single from the film, "Broken Down House", was released in November 2014.

Upon the film's release, LA Weekly called Ryan, Long and Pryce "so bursting with talent that it's impossible to pick a favorite" while the Los Angeles Times looked past the "discordant" acting to praise the "palpable, soulful authenticity" of the music. Ryan admitted in 2014 that she could benefit from an acting coach; in 2017 she said she had matured and would like to try acting again.

=== Beauty products ===
Ryan has long been interested in makeup and starting a line of beauty products. In December 2018, she launched her lipstick line Ciao Bianca with 23 shades, including some named after her songs.

== Health ==
Ryan underwent two vocal surgeries and an abdominal surgery in 2016 after a doctor told her that she was a high-risk candidate for esophageal cancer. One of her vocal cords was paralyzed, and she was told she might never sing again. That surgery was successful and she felt like she was given a 'new' voice. The second surgery came after an ENT told her she had developed blood vessels on her vocal cords; it too was successful. Being out of the public eye during these setbacks left her feeling "like I had just disappeared and everybody was just forgetting [about me]."

The premiere of her song "One Day" was originally set for 2016, but Ryan revisited the lyrics following the surgeries and other roadblocks, "and I can finally say it is my story."

== Discography ==
Studio albums

- Bianca Ryan (2006)

Extended plays

- Christmas Everyday! (2006)
- True Meaning of Christmas (2009)
- The Reintroduction, Pt. 1 (2019)

Soundtrack albums

- We Are Kings (2014)

== Filmography ==
Film
Year	Title	Role	Notes
2005	12 and Holding	Singing Girl	
2014	We Are Kings	Layla Knuckles	

Television
Year	Title	Role	Notes
2003	Star Search	Herself	Contestant
2005	Showtime at the Apollo	Herself	Contestant; winner of Amateur Kids Night
2006	America's Got Talent	Herself	Contestant (winner, season 1)
2018	America's Got Talent: The Champions	Herself	Contestant
2019	America's Got Talent	Herself	Guest performer for first live show

Music videos
Year	Title	Artist	Release date	Notes
2006	"You Light Up My Life"	Bianca Ryan	November 2006	
2006	"Why Couldn't It Be Christmas Every Day?"	Bianca Ryan	December 2006	
2010	"About to Fall"	The Wrecking	September 8, 2010	Lead role (acting only)
2014	"All of Me"	Bianca Ryan	March 3, 2014	
2014	"Broken Down House"	Bianca Ryan	November 6, 2014	
2015	"Alice"	Bianca Ryan	May 26, 2015	
2017	"Man Down"	Bianca Ryan	August 21, 2017	
2018	"Remember"	Bianca Ryan	May 18, 2018	

== See also ==
- America's Got Talent (season 1)

== Notes ==
Preceded by None	America's Got Talent winner Season 1 (Summer 2006)	Succeeded by Terry Fator
