= The Wrecking =

American rock band

- Origin: Portland, Maine
- Genres: Hard rock, post-grunge, rock, alternative rock, pop punk
- Years active: 2007–present
- Labels: Chosen
- Members: Doug Elder; Darren Elder; Karl Anderson; Chris James
- Website: www.thewrecking.net

The Wrecking is an American rock band from Portland, Maine. The band is composed of Doug Elder on vocals and guitar, Darren Elder on drums, Karl Anderson on keys, bass guitar and backing vocals, and Chris James on guitar. The band released their debut studio album under the Chosen Records label on August 19, 2008 called A New Abolition. The second album released under the Chosen Records Label on August 21, 2012 is entitled So Much For Love, and this record has charted on numerous charts.

== Background ==
In 1996, Douglas and Darren Elder founded The Kingpin Wrecking Crew. With Doug on lead vocals and guitar and Darren on drums, joined by Karl Anderson on keyboards/synths/organ, Ty Monroe on bass guitar and Joe McCann on turntables, the band achieved a unique sound of funk rock blended with hip hop and various other styles. After a few years in the band, Monroe parted ways with the band. Anderson resumed bass duties and McCann began playing more keys. The band eventually changed their name to The Wrecking. In 2011, McCann left the group and Chris James joined. The band announced their breakup in 2013.

== Discography ==
=== Album ===
Year	Album	Peak chart positions				
Year	Album	US 200	Top Rock	Top Christian	Top Independent	Top Heatseekers
2008	A New Abolition: Released: August 19, 2008; Label: Chosen Records; Format: CD, Digital download	—	—	32	—	35
2012	So Much For Love: Released: August 21, 2012; Label: Chosen Records; Format: CD, Digital download	140	45	5	21	—

=== Singles ===
Year	Title	Peak Chart Positions	Album
Year	Title	US Christian Rock	Album
2011	"View from the Top"	24	So Much For Love
