= America's Got Talent season 1 =

America's Got Talent
- Season 1
- Showrunner: Jason Raff
- Hosted by: Regis Philbin
- Judges: David Hasselhoff; Piers Morgan; Brandy Norwood
- Winner: Bianca Ryan
- Runners-up: All That; The Millers
- Finals venue: Paramount Studios

Release
- Original network: NBC
- Original release: June 21 – August 17, 2006

Season chronology
- Next → Season 2

The first season of the American talent show competition series America's Got Talent was broadcast on NBC from June 21 to August 17, 2006. The season went into production a year earlier than planned by Got Talent creator Simon Cowell. Cowell intended for Britain's Got Talent to debut before AGT in 2006. However, production was suspended due to internal conflicts within its British television network. David Hasselhoff, Brandy Norwood and Piers Morgan were the show's first judges, with Regis Philbin as host. This season originally had an early format for live round judging and Wildcard acts, which would be changed after the season's conclusion.

The first season was won by singer Bianca Ryan, with clogging dance group All That, and singer/musician duo The Millers finishing as runner-ups within the Top 3 finalists. The season's actual results for second and third place were not declared. The ratings success of this season helped foster the development of other international editions of the Got Talent franchise, along with restarting production on the British edition.

This season is also noteworthy for featuring Jessica Sanchez, who, despite being eliminated in the semifinals, would later go on to win the twentieth season of the show in 2025.

== Season overview ==
Judges and Host for America's Got Talent Season 1

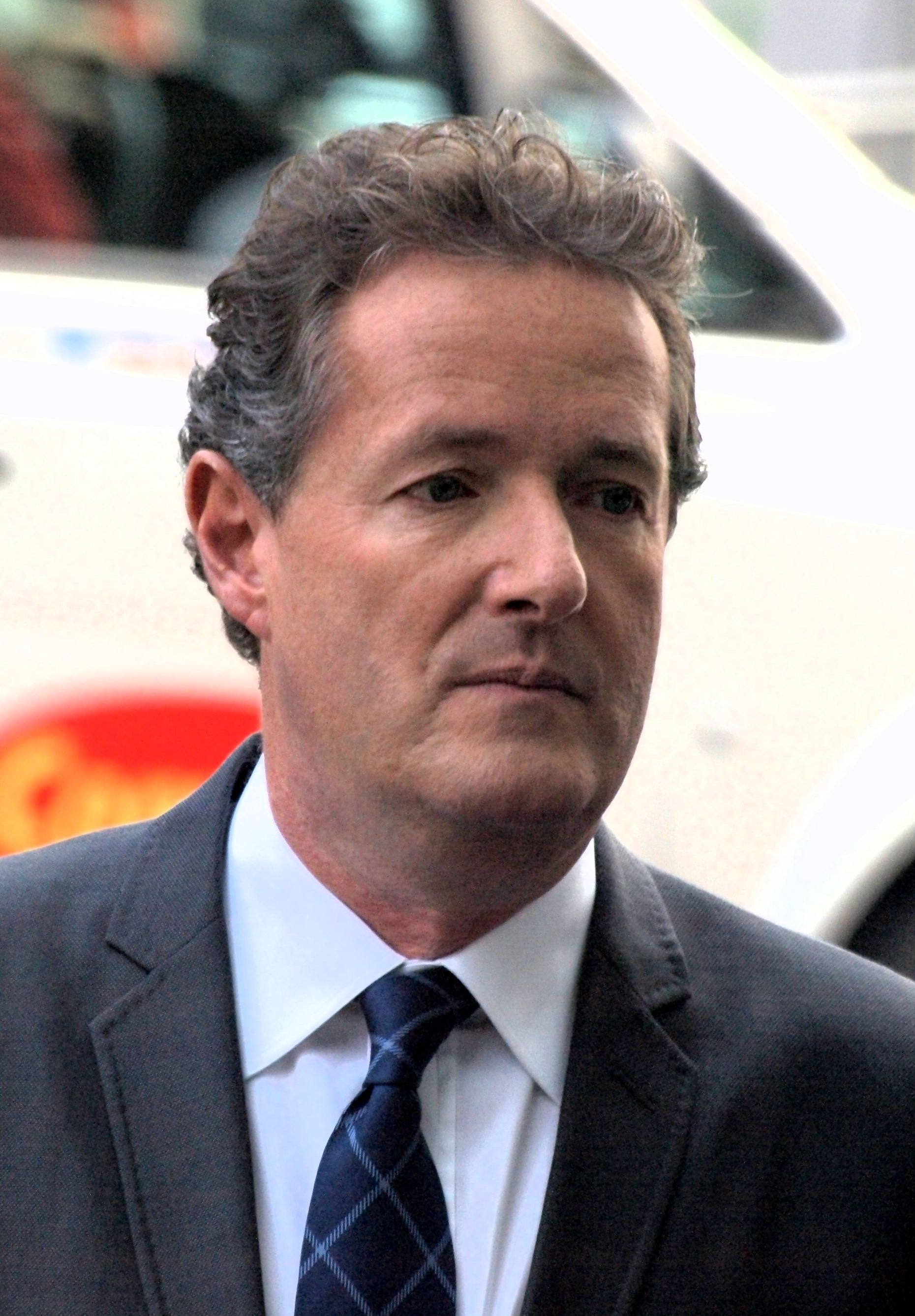
Piers Morgan

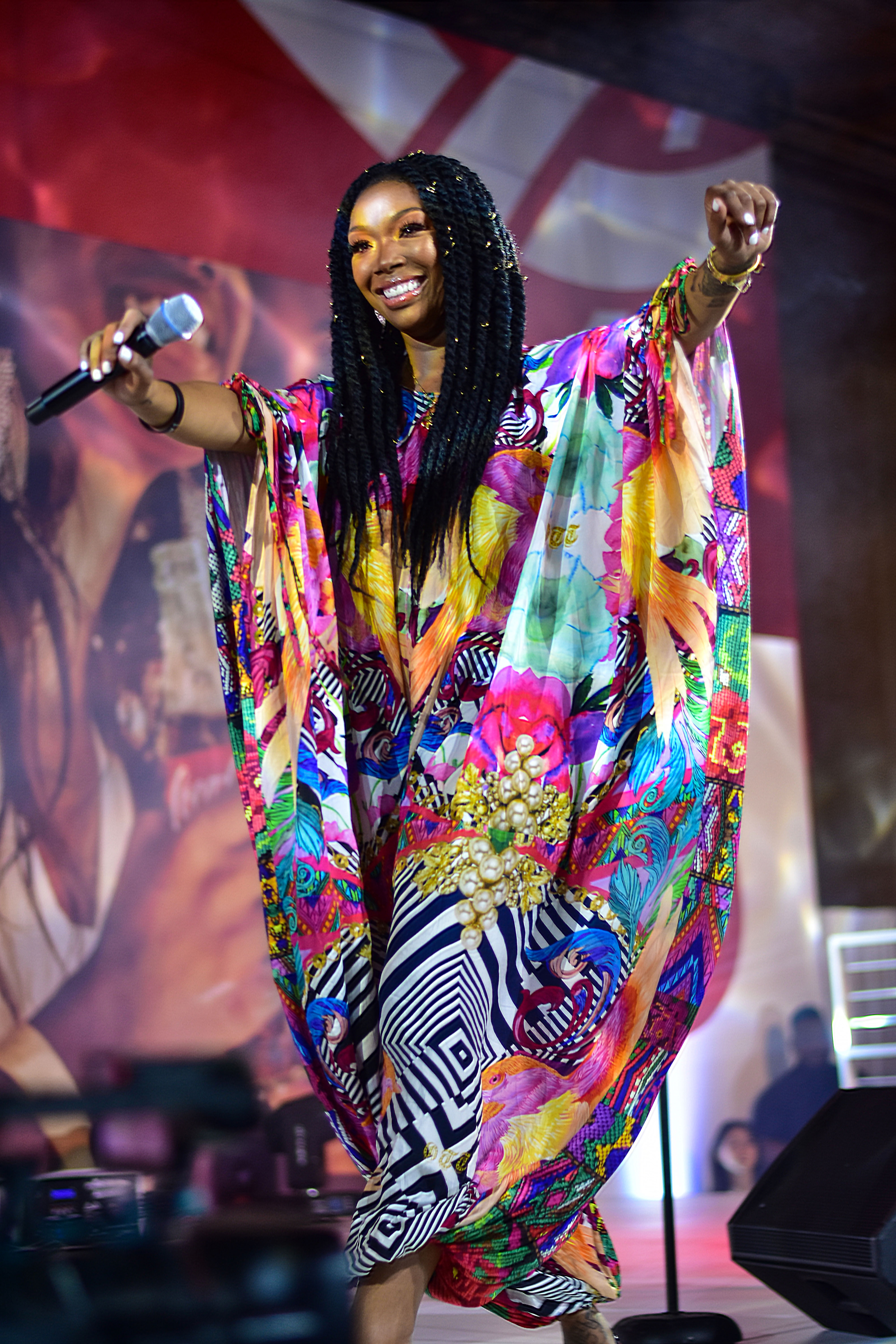
Brandy Norwood

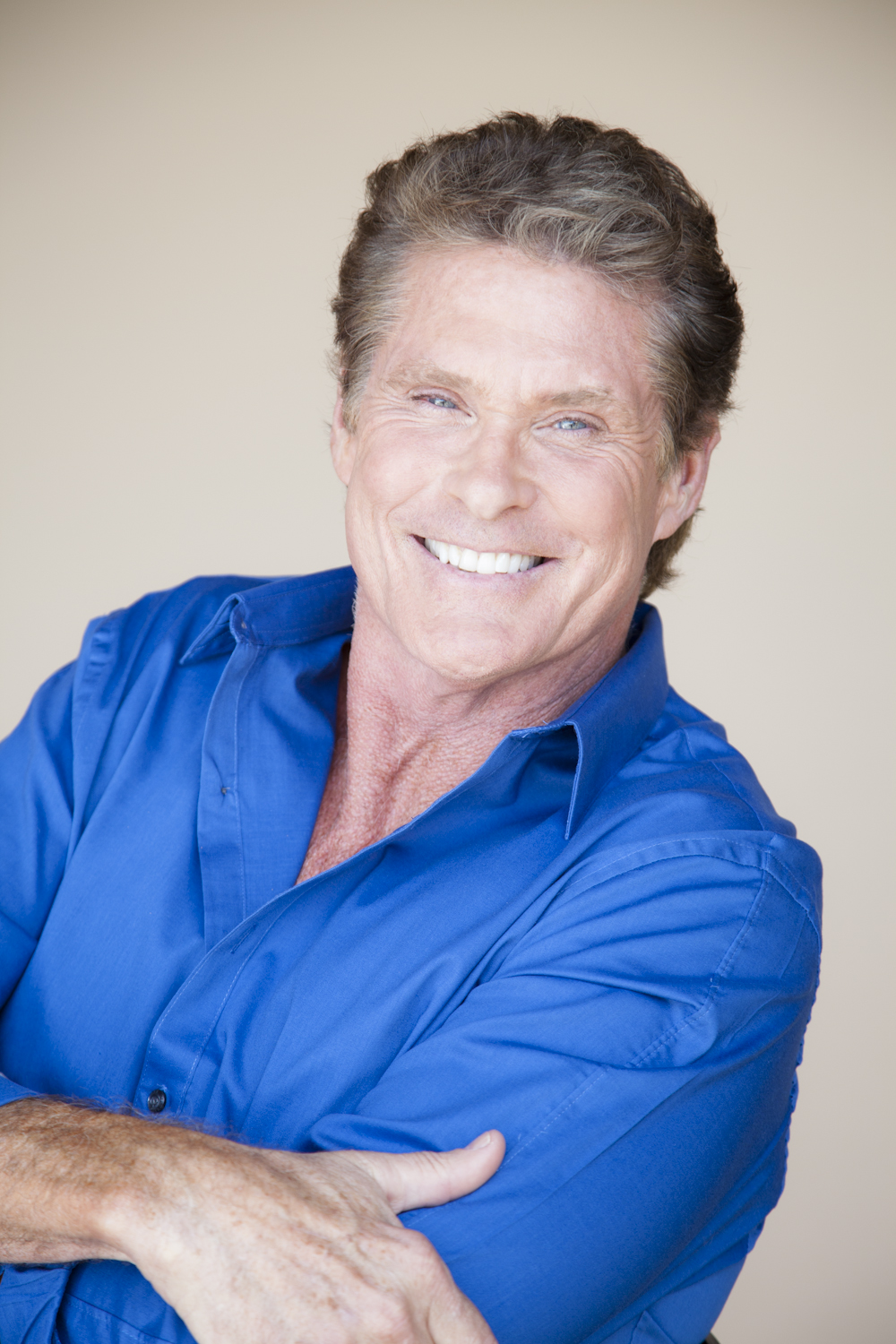
David Hasselhoff

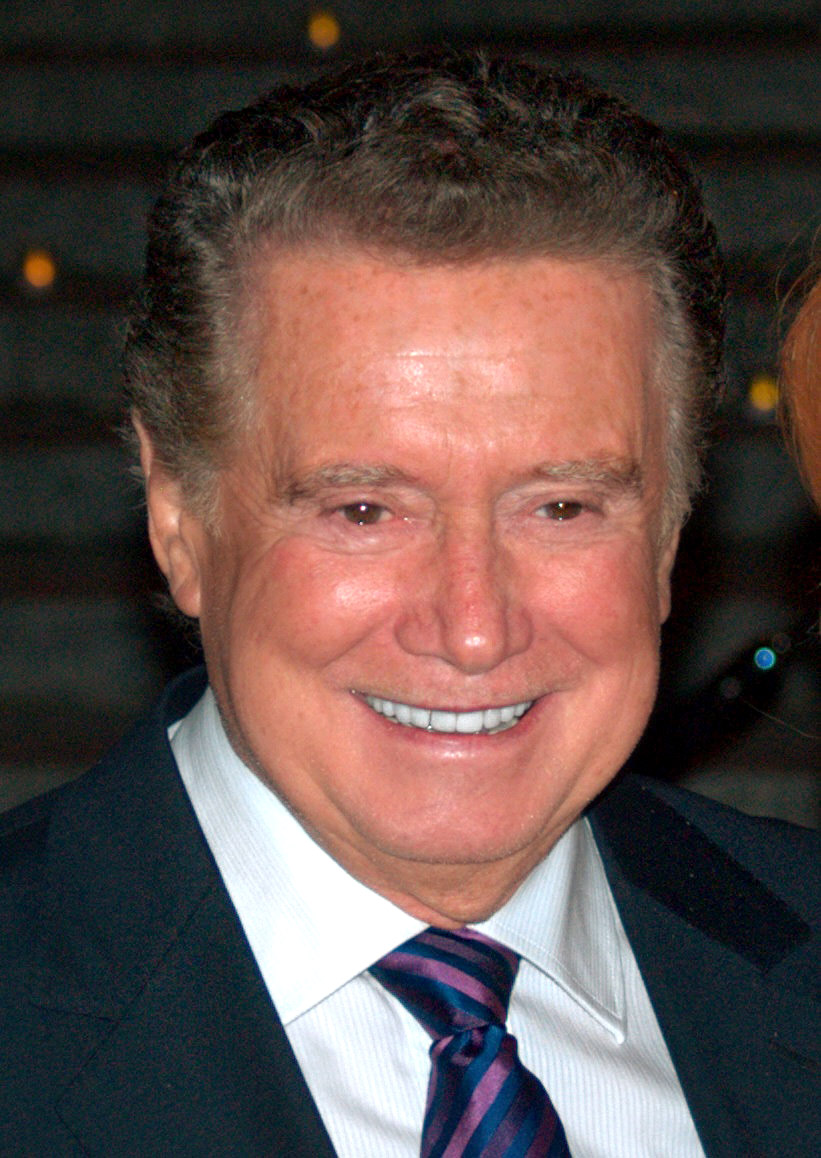
Regis Philbin

In 2005, Simon Cowell devised plans for a televised talent competition, originally intending for it be created and broadcast in Britain through the British broadcaster ITV, with an American edition to follow after its first season. However, following a pilot broadcast of the format, a dispute arose between ITV and Paul O'Grady, the originally intended host of Britain's Got Talent. In the wake of the dispute, after O'Grady decided to sign on to another network, Cowell suspended production on the British edition, and instead focused on the American edition in 2006. His proposal for his program in America was bought by NBC, who commissioned a small season of episodes, along with Fremantle and Cowell's own company Syco Entertainment. Auditions were launched across the United States, while Regis Philbin was picked as the host with David Hasselhoff, Brandy Norwood and Piers Morgan chosen as judges. After the open auditions had been completed, those who had been nominated for the program were entered into more an extensive round of major auditions, which took place across Los Angeles, Chicago and New York in April 2006.

The format used in the first season of America's Got Talent for live rounds differed greatly from what would later be used in later seasons of the program, as well as for other international editions of the Got Talent franchise. In the semi-finals and the final, the judges voted on each participant's performance pertaining to whether they approved or disapproved of an act, with no use of a buzzer to stop a performance at any time. While each semi-final would offer two places in the live final, any act eliminated by this stage would have a chance to be picked as a Wildcard for a special semi-final – two by each judge from any semi-final and one by the public from each round – with an additional two places offered.

Forty of the participants who auditioned for this season secured a place in the semi-finals, with ten performing in each show and eight of the acts making it into the live final. Approximately ten of the semi-finalists who didn't advance were chosen by the judges to compete within a Wildcard round and secured two additional places in the final. These are the results of each participant's overall performance during the season:

Winner | Runner-Up | Finalist | Semi-finalist

Participant	Genre	Act	Semi-final	Result
Alexis Jordan	Singing	Singer	1 ^{1}	Eliminated
All That!	Dance	Dance Group	1 ^{1}	Runner-up
At Last	Singing	Vocal Group	2	Finalist
Bianca Ryan	Singing	Singer	3	Winner
Bobby Badfingers	Music	Finger Snapper	2 ^{1}	Eliminated
Caitlyn Taylor Love	Singing	Singer	3	Eliminated
Celtic Spring	Dance	Dance Group	4	Finalist
Corina Brouder	Singing	Singer	1 ^{1}	Eliminated
Dave the Horn Guy	Music	Horn Performer	2	Eliminated
Dave Smith One Man Sideshow	Danger	Sideshow Performer	4	Eliminated
David & Dania	Magic	Quick Change Duo	4 ^{1}	Finalist
Desperation Squad	Singing / Music	Band	4	Eliminated
Elliot Zimet	Magic	Magician	3	Eliminated
George Komsky	Singing	Singer	4	Eliminated
Hoopalicious	Dance	Hula Hoop Artist	1	Eliminated
J. R. Johns and His Best Friends	Animals	Dog Act	1	Eliminated
Jessica Sanchez	Singing	Singer	5	Eliminated
Kenny Shelton	Variety	Juggler	3	Eliminated
Kevin Johnson	Comedy	Ventriloquist	1	Eliminated
King Charles Unicycle Troupe	Danger	Unicycle Group	4	Eliminated
Leonid the Magnificent	Variety	Novelty Act	2 ^{1}	Eliminated
Lilia Stepanova	Acrobatics	Contortionist	4	Eliminated
Mark the Knife	Danger	Danger Act	2	Eliminated
Michelle L'amour	Dance	Burlesque Dancer	4	Eliminated
Natasha Le	Music	Pianist	2 ^{1}	Eliminated
Nathan Burton	Magic	Magician	3 ^{1}	Eliminated
N'Versity	Singing	Vocal Group	2 ^{1}	Eliminated
Rappin' Granny	Music	Rapper	3	Finalist
Realis	Acrobatics	Acrobatic Duo	2	Finalist
Sean and John	Dance	Tap Dance Duo	4	Eliminated
Shawn Ryan	Singing	Singer	1	Eliminated
Sonia Lee	Music	Electric Violinist	3	Eliminated
Sugar n' Spice	Music	Vocal Group	2	Eliminated
Taylor Ware	Music	Yodeller	1	Finalist
Team Acrodunk	Acrobatics	Basketball Stunt Team	3	Eliminated
Ten13 Concept	Singing / Music	Band	3	Eliminated
The Passing Zone	Variety	Juggling Duo	4	Finalist
The Millers	Singing	Vocal Duo	1	Runner-up
Trey Knight's Stilt World	Variety	Stilt Performers	3	Eliminated
Vladik Miagkostoupov	Variety	Juggler	1	Eliminated
Vladimir Malachkin	Acrobatics	Hand Balancer	2	Eliminated

- ^1 These participants were entered into the Wildcard semi-final, after losing their initial semi-final.

=== Semi-final summary ===
Judge Disapproved | Judge Approved
Won the public vote | Won the judges' vote
Chosen for Wildcard Round (Semi-Finals 1-4 only) | Eliminated

==== Semi-final 1 (July 12) ====
- Guest Performer, Results Show: Teddy Geiger

Semi-Finalist	Order	Judges' Vote			Results (July 13)
Semi-Finalist	Order	Hasselhoff	Norwood	Morgan	Results (July 13)
Taylor Ware	1				Won Public Vote
All That!	2				Eliminated (Chosen for Wildcard Round)
Kevin Johnson	3				Eliminated
Alexis Jordan	4				Eliminated (Chosen for Wildcard Round)
Vladik Miagkostoupov	5	^{2}			Eliminated
Shawn Ryan	6				Eliminated
J. R. Johns and His Best Friends	7				Eliminated
Hoopalicious	8			^{2}	Eliminated
Corina Brouder	9				Eliminated (Chosen for Wildcard Round)
The Millers	10				Judges' choice

- ^2 Each respective judge meant to vote their disapproval for the corresponding performance, but accidentally voted the opposite.

==== Semi-final 2 (July 19) ====
- Guest Performer, Results Show: Jurassic 5

Semi-Finalist	Order	Judges' Vote			Results (July 20)
Semi-Finalist	Order	Hasselhoff	Norwood	Morgan	Results (July 20)
Dave the Horn Guy	1				Eliminated
Realis	2				Judges' choice
At Last	3				Won Public Vote
Natasha Le	4				Eliminated (Chosen for Wildcard Round)
Vladimir Malachkin	5				Eliminated
Bobby Badfingers	6				Eliminated (Chosen for Wildcard Round)
Sugar n' Spice	7				Eliminated
N'Versity	8		^{3}		Eliminated (Chosen for Wildcard Round)
Mark Faje	9				Eliminated
Leonid the Magnificent	10				Eliminated (Chosen for Wildcard Round)

- ^3 Norwood meant to vote her disapproval for this participant, but accidentally voted for the opposite.

==== Semi-final 3 (July 26) ====
- Guest Performer, Results Show: Cirque du Soleil

Semi-Finalist	Order	Judges' Vote			Results (July 27)
Semi-Finalist	Order	Hasselhoff	Norwood	Morgan	Results (July 27)
Team Acrodunk	1				Eliminated
Caitlyn Taylor Love	2				Eliminated
Sonia Lee	3				Eliminated
Elliot Zimet	4				Eliminated
Ten13 Concept	5				Eliminated
Rappin' Granny	6				Judges' choice
Nathan Burton	7				Eliminated (Chosen for Wildcard Round)
Bianca Ryan	8				Won Public Vote
Kenny Shelton	9				Eliminated
Trey Knight's Stilt World	10				Eliminated

==== Semi-final 4 (August 2) ====
- Guest Performer, Results Show: Tom Green

Semi-Finalist	Order	Judges' Vote			Results (August 3)
Semi-Finalist	Order	Hasselhoff	Norwood	Morgan	Results (August 3)
The Passing Zone	1				Judges' choice
Celtic Spring	2				Won Public Vote
Sean and John	3				Eliminated
Lilia Stepanova	4				Eliminated
Dave Smith One Man Sideshow	5				Eliminated
David & Dania	6				Eliminated (Chosen for Wildcard Round)
George Komsky	7				Eliminated
Michelle L'amour	8				Eliminated
King Charles Unicycle Troupe	9				Eliminated
Desperation Squad	10				Eliminated

==== Semi-final 5 - Wildcard Round (August 9) ====
- Guest Performer, Results Show: Penn & Teller

Semi-Finalist	Order	Judges' Vote			Results (August 10)
Semi-Finalist	Order	Hasselhoff	Norwood	Morgan	Results (August 10)
Nathan Burton	1				Eliminated
Bobby Badfingers	2				Eliminated
Jessica Sanchez	3				Eliminated
All That!	4				Judges' choice
Corina Brouder	5				Eliminated
David & Dania	6				Won Public Vote
N'Versity	7				Eliminated
Natasha Le	8				Eliminated
Alexis Jordan	9				Eliminated
Leonid the Magnificent	10				Eliminated

=== Final (August 16) ===
- Guest Performers, Results Show: Aly & AJ, and Blue Man Group

Judge Disapproved | Judge Approved
Winner | Runner-up

Finalist	Order	Judges' Vote			Results (August 17)
Finalist	Order	Hasselhoff	Norwood	Morgan	Results (August 17)
At Last	1				Bottom 5
David & Dania	2		^{4}		Bottom 5
Rappin' Granny	3				Bottom 5
Bianca Ryan	4				Winner
All That!	5				Runner-up (2nd-3rd place) ^{5}
Taylor Ware	6				Top 5
The Passing Zone	7	^{4}			Bottom 5
Celtic Spring	8				Top 5
Realis	9				Bottom 5
The Millers	10				Runner-up (2nd-3rd place) ^{5}

- ^4 Due to partaking in their performances, neither judge voted for these participants.
- ^5 Actual position these acts finished in was not disclosed by the program.
