= Why Couldn't It Be Christmas Every Day? =

Single by Bianca Ryan

from the album Bianca Ryan and Christmas Everyday!
- Released: December 1, 2006
- Recorded: 2006
- Genre: Pop, Christmas
- Length: 4:05 (Bianca Ryan); 4:36 (Christmas Everyday!)
- Label: Sony BMG
- Songwriter(s): Jay Landers, Walter Afanasieff
- Producer(s): Walter Afanasieff

Bianca Ryan singles chronology
"You Light Up My Life" (2006)	"Why Couldn't It Be Christmas Every Day?" (2006)	"That's Not Me" (2007)

"Why Couldn't It Be Christmas Every Day?" is a song by Bianca Ryan from her self-titled debut album. Though not officially released as a single by Columbia Records, radio stations in several countries played the song in 2006 as part of their Christmas-themed programming. During the week of December 12, "Why Couldn't It Be Christmas Every Day?" reached No. 1 on Radio & Records' Netherlands Top 20 Chart. It has also reached No. 15 on the official Dutch Top 40.

A longer remix was included on the promotional EP Christmas Everyday! (2006) and retitled "Why Couldn't It Be Christmas Everyday?"

== Song information ==
"Why Couldn't It Be Christmas Every Day?" was recorded in 2006. It was written by Jay Landers and Walter Afanasieff and produced by the latter. The original song was released as a second single from Bianca Ryan and the lead single from her Christmas Everyday! EP. (Note: The spelling was later changed to 'Everyday'.) The song was a hit in the Netherlands, peaking at number 1 on its Top 20 chart.

Since then, the song has been a holiday mainstay. It has been re-released on numerous compilation albums including Christmas Top 50 (EMI, 2012) and Ultimate Christmas Hits (Sony Music, 2017).

== Chart positions ==
Country	Peak Position
Dutch Dutch Top 40 Chart	15
Dutch Mega Top 50 Chart	52
Dutch Radio & Records' Netherlands Top 20 Chart	1
Dutch Single Top 100	32

== Music video ==
The song also was released as a music video by Sony BMG. The video mainly shows Ryan singing in the same environment throughout the whole video. As the video progresses, Ryan is found holding or playing with various holiday props, or anything on the setting. In addition, she sings into a microphone the whole time as artificial snow is sprinkled down onto her.

== Critical reception ==
In 2016, Billboard music critic Andrew Unterberger included the song on his "Also Worth Remembering" list for 2006.

== 2020 version ==
For her holiday EP What the World Needs Now is Love, Ryan recorded a new version of the song. The video features Ryan's sister Eva and Dance Moms' alumnus Lilliana Ketchman.
