= Kevin Johnson (ventriloquist) =

American entertainer

Kevin Johnson (born June 7, 1970) is a professional ventriloquist, comedian, and magician.

== Biography ==
Born in Colorado, Kevin has been a ventriloquist nearly all his life. Kevin started ventriloquism when he was nine years old, after his parents gave him a pull-string dummy for Christmas. Having no formal training, he taught himself the art of ventriloquism over a 4-year period. He developed his technique from parrots. It intrigued him that parrots could speak so clearly without the use of lips. Kevin later re-learned how to speak all together with the use of his tongue and his throat. Kevin was introduced to the stage by his grandfather Harley Noles, who performed magic shows throughout Colorado. He told Kevin, “If you get good enough, you can open for my show.” At the age of 13, he performed in his grandfather's show with a 5-minute act with a wooden puppet (Raymond), that his grandfather made for him.

During his college days, Johnson taught and entertained youth at a local church where he found a receptive audience for his humor. Upon graduation from college in El Cajon, California, Johnson started performing at the San Diego Zoo in 1994. He then auditioned at Legoland California to pursue his art full-time, and in February 1999, Johnson got the spot and was performing three to four 20-minute shows each day at the Legoland Playtown Theater. Legoland California nominated him for the Big E Awards through IAAPA and won the honor of “Best Male Performer” in 2004 and 2006. Kevin is the only known performer to be recognized twice. IAAPA is the International Association of Amusement Parks and Attractions, and includes attractions from over 90 countries.

Kevin is mostly recognized from his 2006 appearance on NBC’s primetime show America's Got Talent. He performed his signature "Godzilla Theater" performance, during which his voice and the voices of his puppets are out of synchronization with their mouth movements. He had developed a different version of his performance specifically for the semi-finals, in which he also exchanges voices with his puppets and simulates echos, but didn't get enough audience votes to advance to the finals.

In February 2007, Kevin appeared on the Late Show with David Letterman for the show's second "Ventriloquist Week". Starting in 2008, Johnson has started doing shows on board the Disney Cruise Line ship, "The Disney Magic." These shows last about 45 minutes and feature Clyde and Matilda, along with another puppet that is much more human like, whose name is Harley. He has recently finished a nine-year run at San Diego's Legoland California Theme Park where he performed 8,824 shows. He is currently performing during the Summer Nights at Busch Gardens Tampa. Kevin also performs every Tuesday at the Lawrence Welk Resort in Escondido, California, performing a 40-minute show alongside magician Anthony the Magic in a show entitled "The Comedy and Magic Show".

=== Clyde and Matilda ===
Clyde and Matilda are his signature puppets. In 1983, Johnson was introduced to Clyde the Buzzard in his native state of Colorado, and performed his first "real" show with his grandfather. Nearly 10 years later, in 1991, Kevin was introduced to Matilda the Cockatoo. After adding Matilda to Clyde he performed as a trio.

== Family ==
Johnson is married and lives in nearby Temecula with his wife Cherie and their five children.
