= Zayde Wolf =

American singer-songwriter (born 1977)

- Born: Dustin Burnett; October 22, 1977 (age 48); Louisville, Kentucky
- Genres: Pop rock; indie pop; alternative rock
- Occupations: Musician, singer-songwriter, record producer
- Years active: 2015-present
- Formerly of: The October (lead singer)
- Spouse: Miranda Burnett
- Website: www.zaydewolf.com

Dustin Burnett (born October 22, 1977), known professionally as Zayde Wolf (also formatted as Zayde Wølf), is an American musician, singer-songwriter, and record producer. His songs have been shown in many forms of media, including film, television, video games, and advertisements.

== Early life ==
Dustin Burnett was born on October 22, 1977, in Louisville, Kentucky, but he was raised in the town of Metropolis, Illinois. His mother sold the family piano to buy a keyboard, which was then sold to buy a guitar for him. His parents always saved money to get Burnett and his brothers instruments.

== Career ==
Before becoming Zayde Wolf, Burnett was in the alternative rock band The October as the lead singer, along with producing songs for other artists such as Tyrone Wells, Us the Duo, and Dave Barnes. The band broke up, resulting in his move to Nashville, Tennessee.

Near the end of 2015, Burnett started producing concept music. He had ideas, but could not find any singers, causing him to just sing them himself. Upon finishing the songs, Burnett sent them to a licensing company called Lyric House in Los Angeles, listing his name as "Zayde Wolf." The president, Jessica Cole, licensed the song and requested more. Burnett's alter ego's name was originally intended to be for his third child, whose gender was not determined at the time, as both he and his wife chose a name for a boy, with his wife choosing "Zayde" as a first name and Burnett choosing "Wolf" as a middle name. The baby turned out to be a girl, so they ended up using a different name.

Fulfilling Cole's request for more songs, Burnett released an album in 2016, Golden Age, which caught on positively with the general public.

=== In media ===
"Gladiator" was used in episodes of Teen Mom OG, Are You the One?, Love Island. "Top of the World" can also be heard in other episodes of the two former shows. Other songs by Burnett have been in media such as Fortnite, Shameless, Jack Reacher: Never Go Back, and Maze Runner: The Death Cure.

In 2019, Burnett's song "We Got the Power" was used as an opening for WWE's 2019 Royal Rumble. "Cold Blooded" was the Chicago Cubs' spring 2019 theme song, and Dude Perfect commonly uses his songs in their videos. The Cleveland Cavaliers, featured one of his songs in a package video and "Home" was presented in a performance during the Stanley Cup finals.

== Personal life ==
Burnett and his wife, Miranda, have three children. He also is the founder of a drum sample company, That Sound. Burnett also is fond of the NBA and enjoys going to their basketball games.

Burnett joined DrLupo's 24-hour live stream in December 2021 to help raise money for cancer research for St. Jude Children's Research Hospital. He played the card game UNO with Annemunition and BigCheeseKIT, raising $50,000.

== Influences and music style ==
Some of the main themes in Burnett's music are perseverance, trust, connection, and encouragement.

== Discography ==
=== Studio albums ===
Title	Details
Golden Age	Released: November 4, 2016; Labels: Morning Routine Collective, Lyric House LLC; Formats: Digital download
Modern Alchemy	Released: June 8, 2018; Label: Morning Routine Collective, Lyric House LLC; Formats: Digital download
Neon Blood Type	Released: May 7, 2021; Label: Self-released; Formats: Digital download

=== Collaborative albums ===
Title	Details
Zayde and the Stereo War (with Duncan Sparks)	Released: June 16, 2023; Label: Self-released; Formats: Digital download

=== Extended plays ===
Title	Details
Rare Breed	Released: April 1, 2016; Label: Lyric House LLC; Formats: Digital download
The Hidden Memoir	Released: March 3, 2017; Label: Self-released; Formats: Digital download
Reimagined, Vol. 1	Released: October 30, 2020; Label: Self-released; Formats: Digital download

=== Singles ===
Title	Year	Album
"Built for This Time"	2015	Golden Age
"Save Tonight"	2016	Non-album singles
"No Limits"	2016	Non-album singles
"Live Life"	2016	Golden Age
"Walk Through the Fire" (with Ruelle)	2016	Golden Age
"Will I Fall"	2016	Non-album single
"Born Ready"	2016	Golden Age
"Brave"	2017	Modern Alchemy
"The Jungle"	2017	Non-album single
"Higher Than High"	2017	Modern Alchemy
"Gladiator"	2018	Modern Alchemy
"Gladiator - MONO_KYO Remix" (with MONO_KYO)	2018	Modern Alchemy
"Rule the World"	2018	Modern Alchemy
"Cold-Blooded"	2019	Non-album singles
"The Boys of Summer"	2019	Non-album singles
"Rumble"	2019	Neon Blood Type
"Oblivion"	2019	Non-album singles
"Oblivion - Reimagined"	2019	Non-album singles
"Still Fighting for It"	2019	Neon Blood Type
"New Blood - Reimagined"	2020	Reimagined, Vol. 1
"Let's Go"	2020	Neon Blood Type
"I Got You (End of the World)"	2020	Non-album single
"Brand New Thing"	2020	Neon Blood Type
"Born Ready - Reimagined"	2020	Reimagined, Vol. 1
"Back at It"	2021	Neon Blood Type
"Madness"	2021	Neon Blood Type
"Holy Water"	2021	Neon Blood Type
"Renegade"	2022	Non-album singles
"Miracles" (with HØVDING)	2022	Non-album singles
"All Our Friends" (with Duncan Sparks)	2022	Zayde and the Stereo War
"Danger Zone"	2022	Non-album single
"Future Electric"	2022	Zayde and the Stereo War
"That Energy"	2023	Non-album singles
"Jumping Into Danger" (with EDVN)	2023	Non-album singles
"It's Not Over"	2023	Non-album singles
"It's Not Over - Slowed & Reverbed Remix"	2023	Non-album singles
"Everybody Looking at Us"	2023	Zayde and the Stereo War
"Back in the Fight" (with EDVN)	2023	Non-album singles
"Fangs"	2023	Non-album singles
"Maniac" (with EDVN and Sam Tinnesz)	2023	Non-album singles
"The Warrior"	2024	Non-album singles
