= Geography of Arkansas =

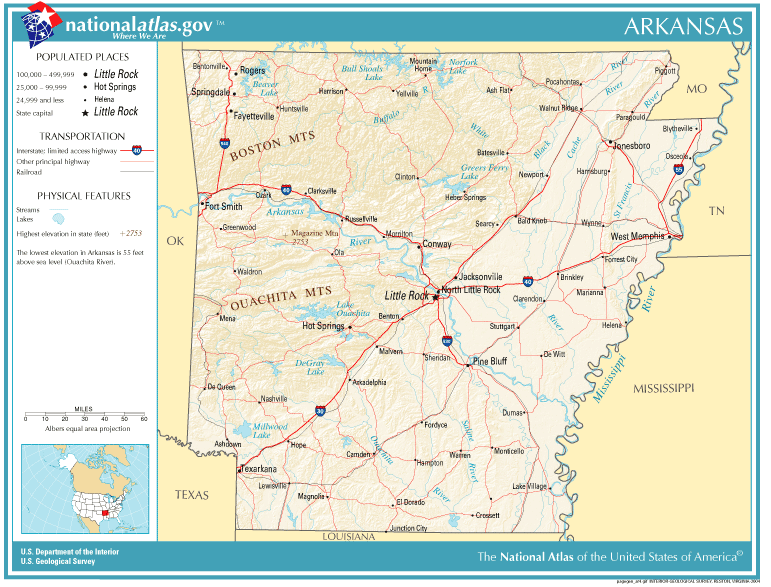
Physical and human geographic features of Arkansas

The geography of Arkansas varies widely. The state is covered by mountains, river valleys, forests, lakes, and bayous in addition to the cities of Arkansas. Hot Springs National Park features bubbling springs of hot water, formerly sought across the country for their healing properties. Crowley's Ridge is a geological anomaly rising above the surrounding lowlands of the Mississippi embayment.

The Buffalo National River, as it flows through The Ozarks to the White River, is a popular tourist attraction. It was designated the first national river in 1972 after years of conservation efforts in opposition to a United States Army Corps of Engineers plan to dam the river. The Arkansas River enters the state near Van Buren and flows southeast through Little Rock to empty into the Mississippi River near Arkansas Post. Most of the river serves barge traffic to Tulsa, Oklahoma, as the McClellan–Kerr Arkansas River Navigation System. Through south Arkansas, the Ouachita River and the Saline River run roughly parallel to the Arkansas, and the major rivers in northeast Arkansas are the White River and St. Francis River. The Red River runs through the southwest corner of the state.

Arkansas has many manmade lakes across the state, many are the basis for state parks, wildlife management areas, or other recreation. Bull Shoals Lake, DeGray Lake, Lake Dardanelle, Lake Ouachita all have state parks along their shores, and Beaver Lake, Table Rock Lake, Greers Ferry Lake, Lake Hamilton and Lake Catherine are also major recreation lakes in the state.

The Ozarks is a broad term for many mountainous counties in northwest Arkansas. This region is usually referred to the Ozarks because the term Northwest Arkansas is the colloquial name for the Fayetteville–Springdale–Rogers Metropolitan Area, including Benton, Madison, Washington counties in Arkansas and McDonald County, Missouri. The Ozark, however, span from the Arkansas River in the south through north central Arkansas. The Boston Mountains subset contain highest peaks in the Ozarks.

== Location and size ==
Location of Arkansas in the United States

Arkansas is located in the southeastern United States, in the West South Central Census Bureau division. Arkansas covers an area of 53,179 square miles (137,733 km²) and ranks as the 29th largest state by size. The state borders six U.S. states: Missouri to the north, Tennessee and Mississippi across the Mississippi River to the east, Louisiana to the south, Oklahoma to the west, and Texas to the southwest.

First added to the United States of America as part of the Louisiana Territory of the Louisiana Purchase in 1803, Arkansas later became part of the Missouri Territory upon its establishment in 1812. This was further divided into the Arkansaw Territory on March 2, 1819, as everything south of Parallel 36°30′ north (except the Missouri Bootheel) to the Louisiana state line. This new territory also included most of present-day Oklahoma until gaining its current boundaries in the 1840s. The slight oddity in Arkansas's western boundary results from a dispute with the Choctaw Nation in 1824. The Choctaws wanted the western boundary of Arkansas to start 100 paces east of Fort Smith and run south to the Red River, claiming the land had little timber and poor soil. Despite protests from Henry Conway, President James Monroe signed the bill into law on January 20, 1825.

=== Regions ===
Arkansas's regions are defined using many different criteria. Distinct natural regions of Arkansas include The Ozarks, Ouachita Mountains, Arkansas River Valley, Gulf Coastal Plain, Crowley's Ridge, the Arkansas Delta, Arkansas Timberlands, and Central Arkansas. Arkansans usually identify as being from one of five regions: northwest, southwest, northeast, southeast, or central Arkansas. These directional regions are not specifically defined by county.

==== Northwest Arkansas ====
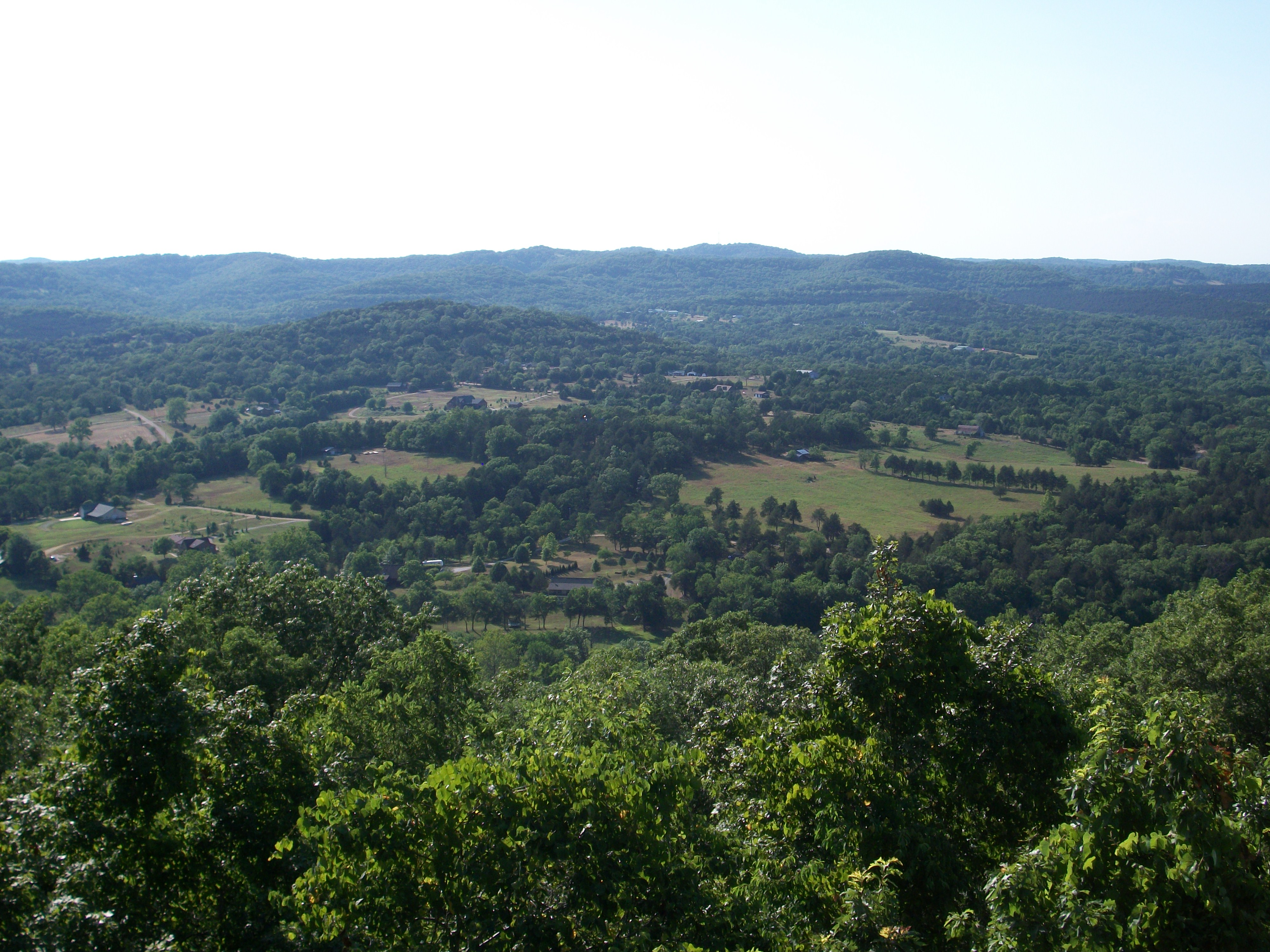
View from scenic overlook in Carroll County in the heart of the Ozarks.

Northwest Arkansas contains the southern half of the Ozarks, including the steeper Boston Mountains and the more gentle Springfield Plateau. These mountains are heavily forested by an oak-hickory ecosystem and less than 25% has been cleared for agriculture. The Ozark National Forest, administered by the National Forest Service, preserves 1,200,000 acres (490,000 ha) of land in northwest Arkansas, including Arkansas's highest point, Mount Magazine in Mount Magazine State Park. Also within northwest Arkansas is the Arkansas River Valley including the tri-peaks tourist region of Mount Nebo, Mount Magazine, Petit Jean Mountain, and Lake Dardanelle. Federal and state protected areas such as the Buffalo National River, Buffalo National River Wilderness, Bull Shoals–White River State Park, and Hobbs State Park – Conservation Area preserve the northwest Arkansas Ozarks in their natural state.

Population is anchored by the Fayetteville–Springdale–Rogers Metropolitan Area and Fort Smith metropolitan area, with sparsely populated mountainous areas defining the remainder of the region. The Ozark culture, such as Ozark Folk Festival held annually in Mountain View, defines much of the rural parts of northwest Arkansas. The Ozark Folk Center in Mountain View is dedicated to preserving northwest Arkansas's folk heritage. Other cultural centers are Bentonville, home to Crystal Bridges Museum of American Art, and Fayetteville, home to the University of Arkansas and Walton Arts Center.

==== Northeast Arkansas ====
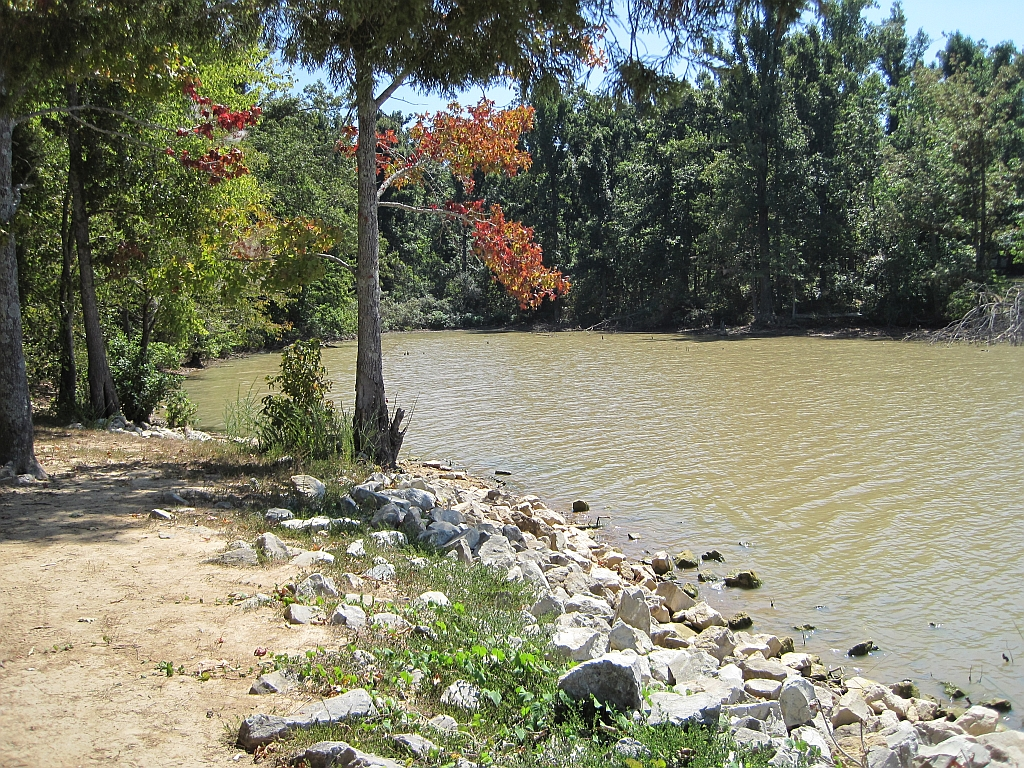
Lake Frierson State Park is atop Crowley's Ridge in northeast Arkansas

Northeast Arkansas is generally characterized as the area east of the Ozark Mountains and north of Interstate 40. The land is adjacent to the Mississippi River and generally flat, fertile, swampy lands sometimes called the Arkansas Delta. The exception is Crowley's Ridge, a geological remnant from the Pleistocene era that raises around 200 feet (61 m) above the surrounding delta lowlands. Crowley's Ridge is more populated than the sparsely populated delta, including larger cities Jonesboro, Paragould, Forrest City, and Wynne. Primary waterways in the region include the Cache River, St. Francis River, and the Black River. Protected areas of northeast Arkansas include Cache River National Wildlife Refuge, Bald Knob National Wildlife Refuge, Wapanocca National Wildlife Refuge, Lake Charles State Park, and Lake Poinsett State Park.

Tourists can explore some of the local Native American culture at the Nodena site, Parkin Archaeological State Park, and Hampson Museum State Park. Following settlement, most of the area relied on cotton as the primary cash crop, and was home to many powerful plantation owners in the antebellum period. After the Civil War, agriculture became based on sharecropping and tenant farming, allowing plantation owners to keep their workers in poverty and maintain their political power. Much of this history is alive today at museums like the Southern Tenant Farmers Union Museum in Tyronza. The rivers served as highways for commerce and communication in the early days, and steamboat towns of days past have been restored for visitors to enjoy, including Jacksonport State Park and Powhatan Historic State Park along the Black River. Davidsonville Historic State Park preserves one of the state's first settlements as a frontier town, also located on the Black River. The primary population center of the region is the Jonesboro metropolitan area, with Jonesboro serving as the principal city.

==== Southeast Arkansas ====
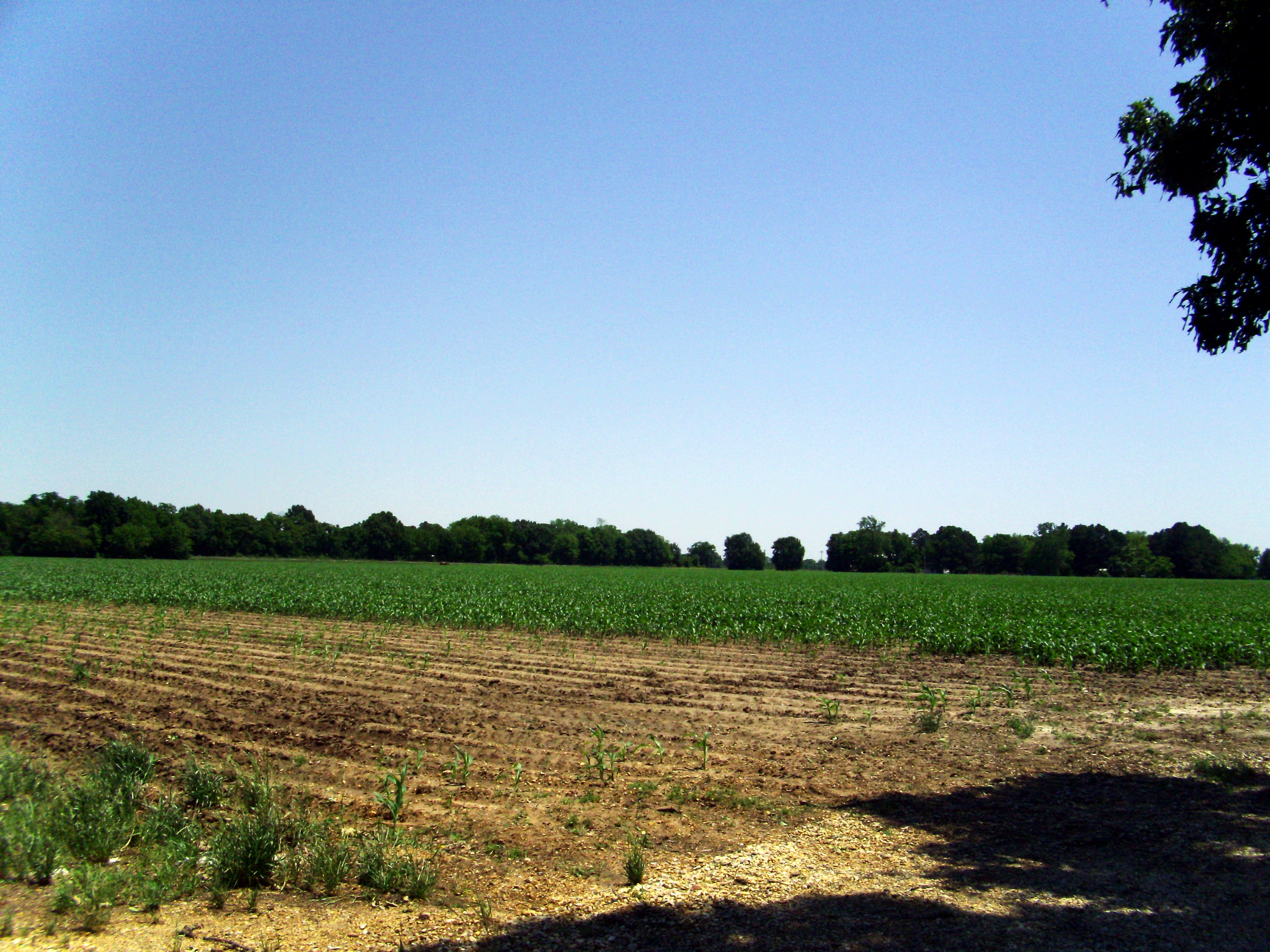
Flat land in cultivation, such as this in Desha County, is typical of Southeast Arkansas

Southeast Arkansas is generally characterized as the area east of Little Rock and south of Interstate 40. The land is adjacent to the Mississippi River and generally flat, fertile, swampy lands sometimes called the Arkansas Delta. This region is sparsely populated, with an economy primarily driven by agriculture. The western side of Southeast Arkansas includes the Piney Woods, a region known for dense pine and cypress forests. Silviculture and agriculture are prominent in this section of the region. Population centers include Pine Bluff, Stuttgart, Monticello, Warren and Crossett. Primary waterways in the region include the Arkansas River, Bayou Bartholomew, Mississippi River and the White River. Protected areas of southeast Arkansas include Cane Creek State Park, Delta Heritage Trail State Park, Felsenthal National Wildlife Refuge, Lake Chicot State Park, Mississippi River State Park, Overflow National Wildlife Refuge and White River National Wildlife Refuge.

The flat topography and fertile soils of Southeast Arkansas have been important to the region throughout its history, first to the Native American that inhabited the region. This history is available today at museums like the Pine Bluff/Jefferson County Historical Museum. The area was one of the first explored and settled in Arkansas; including the territorial capital at Arkansas Post. Following widespread settlement, most of the area was put into cotton cultivation due to the region's fertile soils. The staple's high market value made many plantation owners wealthy in the antebellum period; this history is available to visitors at museums such as the Lakeport Plantation. After the Civil War, agriculture became based on sharecropping and tenant farming, allowing plantation owners to keep their workers in poverty and maintain their political power and social dominance. In the 1950s, mechanization reduced the need for laborers on the farm, driving much of the region's population elsewhere in order to find jobs. Throughout much of Southeast Arkansas, population has continued to decline and economies have continued to shrink ever since. The primary population center of the region is the Pine Bluff metropolitan area, with Pine Bluff serving as the principal city.

==== Southwest Arkansas ====
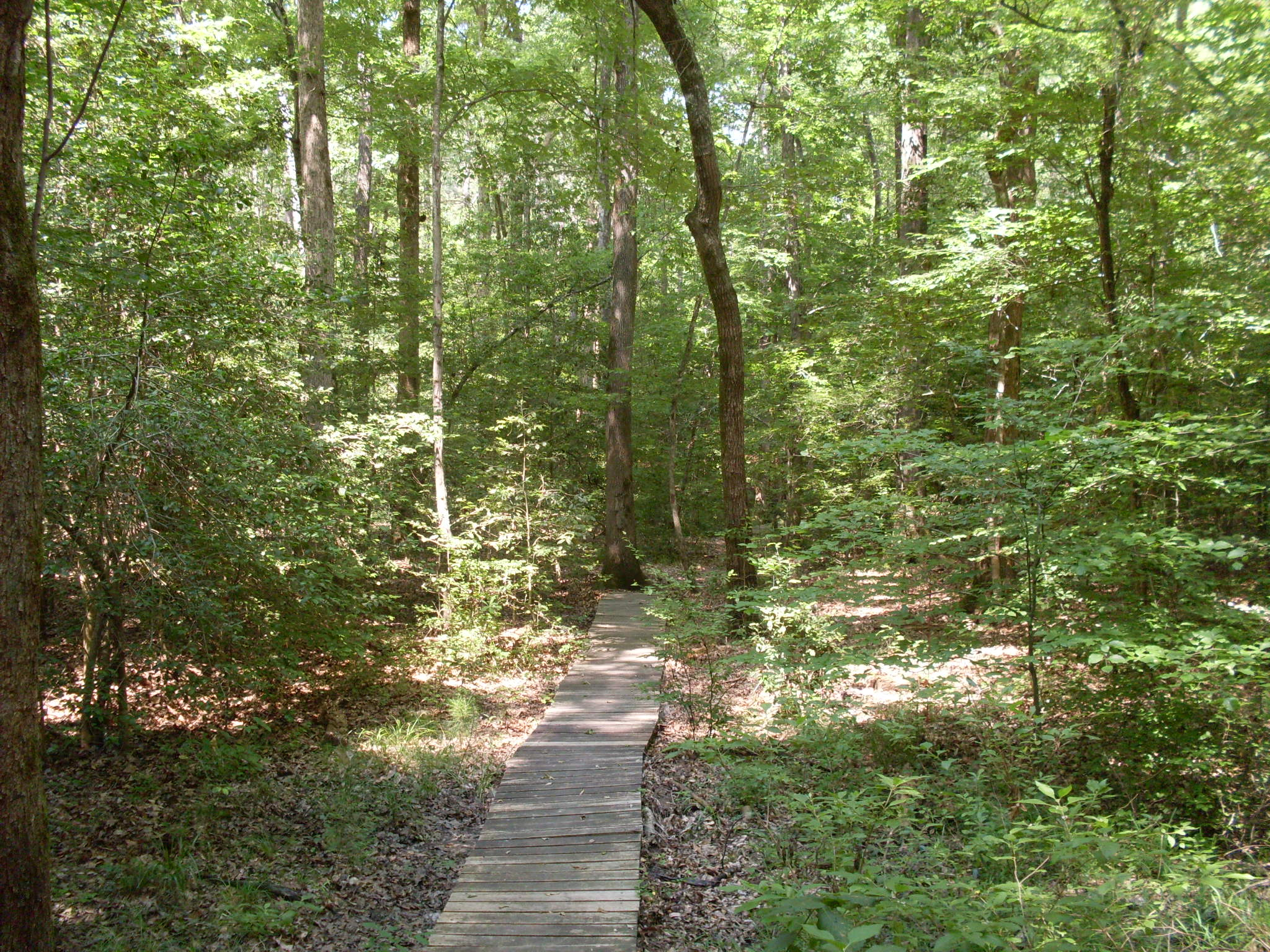
Hiking trail at White Oak Lake State Park

Southwest Arkansas is largely covered in a thick pine, hickory, and oak forest known as the Piney Woods, with much of the land being preserved in the Ouachita National Forest. Modern settlement created a significant logging industry and subsequent clearance agriculture which provided the basis of the local economy until the discovery of petroleum. Population centers include Hot Springs, a popular tourist destination known for the natural hot springs protected within Hot Springs National Park, Oaklawn Park racing resort, and historic buildings; and Texarkana, which straddles the Texas state line in the southwest corner of Arkansas.

Most of Southwest Arkansas is sparsely populated, with small towns separated by long roadways through stands of pine trees. Outdoor recreation in rural areas includes deer hunting and bass fishing at manmade lakes dotting the region, including Lake Ouachita, Lake Hamilton, Millwood Lake, and DeGray Lake. Protected areas include Cossatot River State Park-Natural Area, Daisy State Park, Logoly State Park, Millwood State Park, South Arkansas Arboretum, White Oak Lake State Park, and Pond Creek National Wildlife Refuge.

The region can be roughly defined by Sevier County in the northwest, a portion of Jefferson County in the northeast, Ashley County in the southeast, and Miller County in the southwest.

===== Diamond Lakes =====
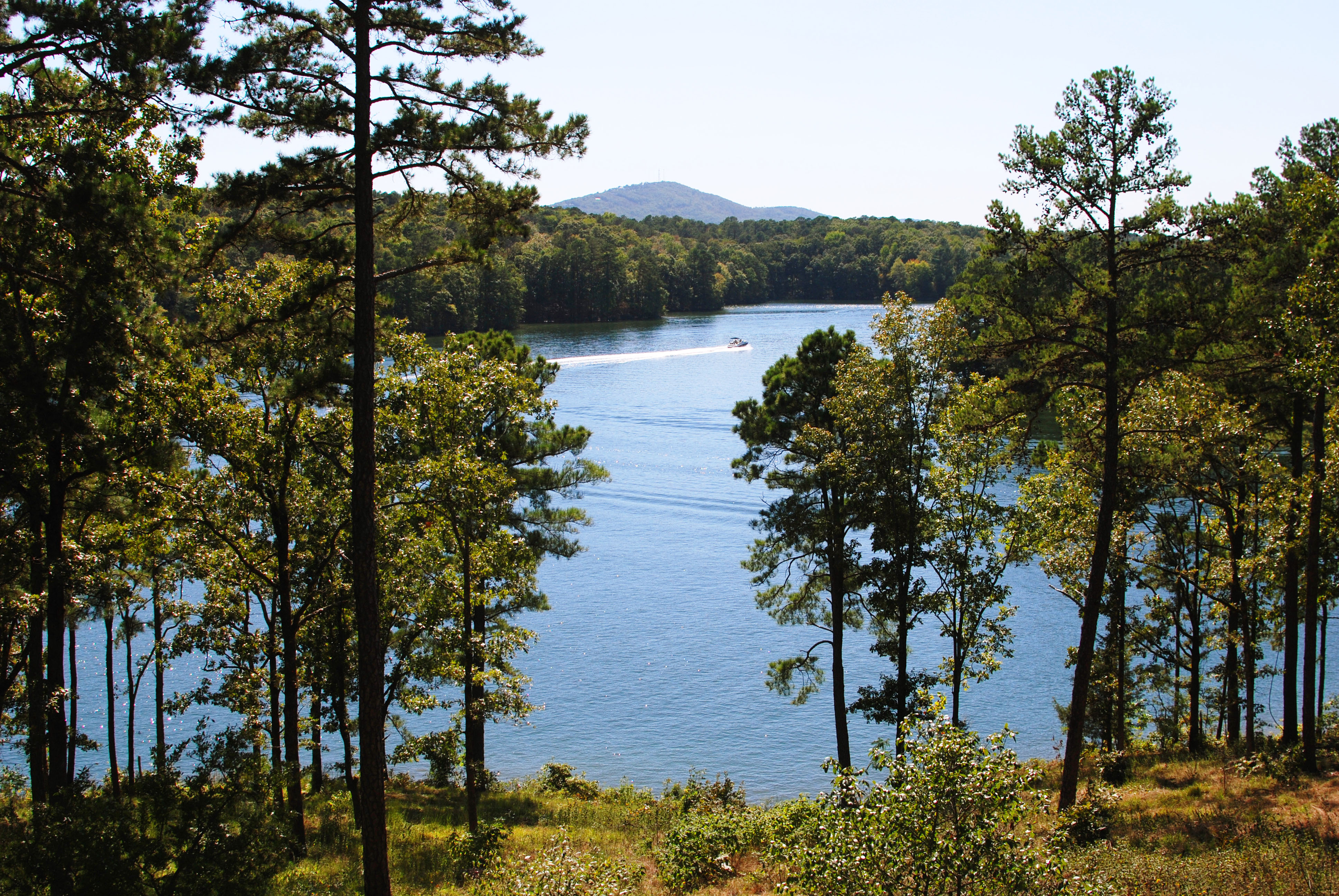
Lake Hamilton viewed from Garvan Woodland Gardens property

Within Southwest Arkansas, a tourism region known as the Diamond Lakes region consists of five counties: Clark, Garland, Hot Spring, Montgomery and Pike, with five major lakes, five state parks, three rivers, and Hot Springs National Park. Three lakes are along the Ouachita River: Lake Ouachita between Mount Ida and Hot Springs, Lake Hamilton south of Hot Springs, and Lake Catherine near Diamondhead. The Caddo River forms DeGray Lake before emptying into the Ouachita near Arkadelphia. The Little Missouri River creates Lake Greeson north of Murfreesboro.

== Climate ==
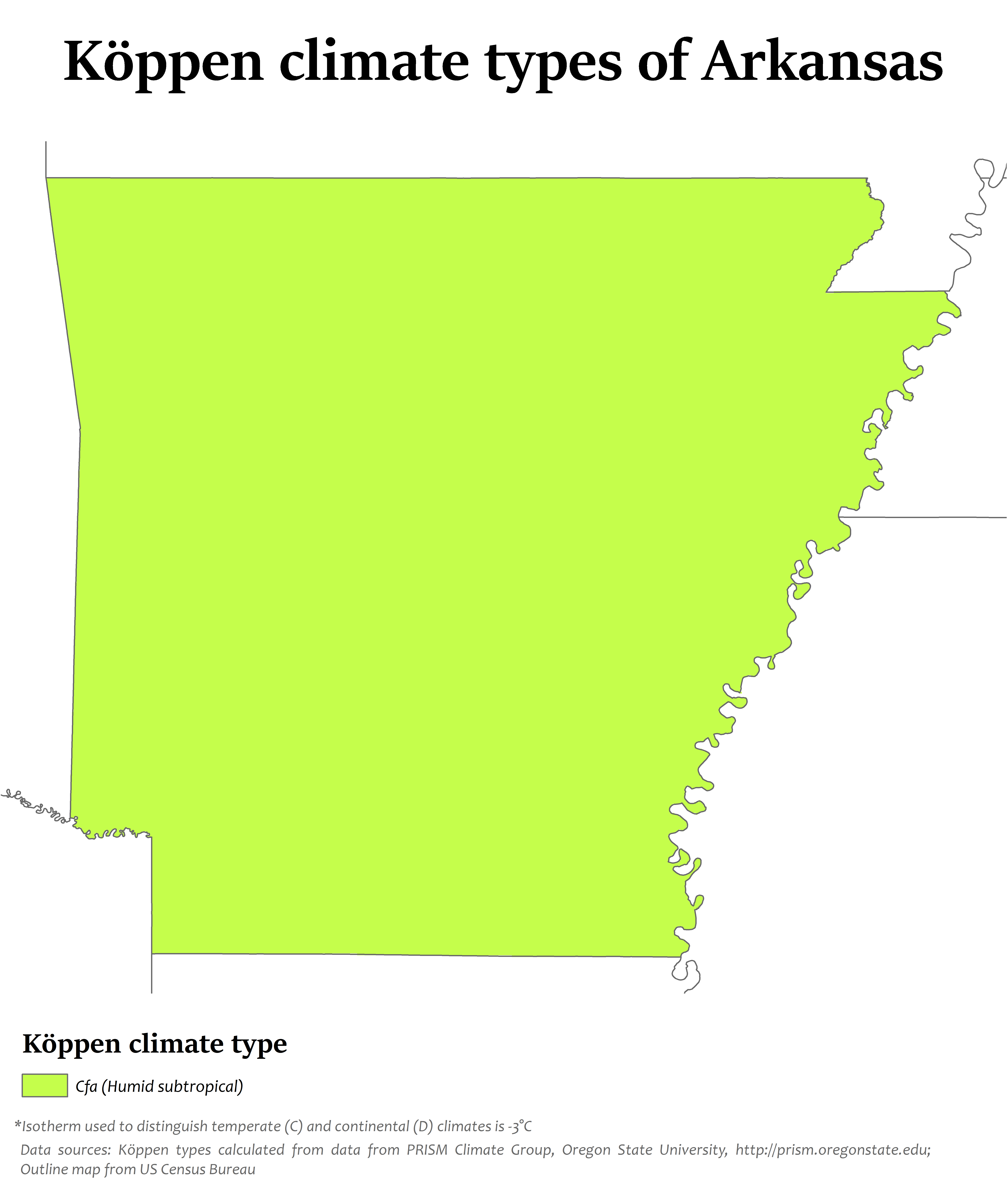
All of Arkansas falls under the humid subtropical

Arkansas generally has a humid subtropical climate (Cfa in the Köppen climate classification). All months average above freezing and at least one month averages above 22°C (71.6°F). According to the Trewartha climate classification the majority of the state is humid subtropical (Cf), while areas that only have seven months above 50°F (10°C) (mainly northern areas and in the Boston Mountains) are oceanic (Do.)

While not bordering the Gulf of Mexico, Arkansas is still close enough to the warm, large body of water for it to influence the weather in the state. Generally, Arkansas has hot, humid summers and slightly drier, mild to cool winters. In Little Rock, the daily high temperatures average around 93 °F (34 °C) with lows around 73 °F (23 °C) in July. In January highs average around 51 °F (11 °C) and lows around 32 °F (0 °C). In Siloam Springs in the northwest part of the state, the average high and low temperatures in July are 89 and 67 °F (32 and 19 °C) and in January the average high and low are 44 and 23 °F (7 and −5 °C).

Annual precipitation throughout the state averages between about 40 and 60 inches (1,000 and 1,500 mm); it is somewhat wetter in the south and drier in the northern part of the state. Snowfall is infrequent but most common in the northern half of the state. The half of the state south of Little Rock is apter to see ice storms. Arkansas's record high is 120 °F (49 °C) at Ozark on August 10, 1936; the record low is −29 °F (−34 °C) at Gravette, on February 13, 1905.

Arkansas is known for extreme weather and frequent storms. A typical year brings thunderstorms, tornadoes, hail, snow and ice storms. Between both the Great Plains and the Gulf States, Arkansas, receives around 60 days of thunderstorms. Arkansas is located in Tornado Alley, and as a result, a few of the most destructive tornadoes in U.S. history have struck the state. While sufficiently far from the coast to avoid a direct hit from a hurricane, Arkansas can often get the remnants of a tropical system, which dumps tremendous amounts of rain in a short time and often spawns smaller tornadoes.

=== Climate data ===
Monthly Normal High and Low Temperatures For Various Arkansas Cities
City	Jan	Feb	Mar	Apr	May	Jun	Jul	Aug	Sep	Oct	Nov	Dec	Avg
Fayetteville	44/24 (7/-4)	51/29 (10/-2)	59/38 (15/3)	69/46 (20/8)	76/55 (24/13)	84/64 (29/18)	89/69 (32/20)	89/67 (32/19)	81/59 (27/15)	70/47 (21/9)	57/37 (14/3)	48/28 (9/-2)	68/47 (20/8)
Jonesboro	45/26 (7/-3)	51/30 (11/-1)	61/40 (16/4)	71/49 (22/9)	80/58 (26/15)	88/67 (31/19)	92/71 (34/22)	91/69 (33/20)	84/61 (29/16)	74/49 (23/9)	60/39 (15/4)	49/30 (10/-1)	71/49 (21/9)
Little Rock	51/31 (11/-1)	55/35 (13/2)	64/43 (18/6)	73/51 (23/11)	81/61 (27/16)	89/69 (32/21)	93/73 (34/23)	93/72 (34/22)	86/65 (30/18)	75/53 (24/12)	63/42 (17/6)	52/34 (11/1)	73/51 (23/11)
Texarkana	53/31 (11/-1)	58/34 (15/1)	67/42 (19/5)	75/50 (24/10)	82/60 (28/16)	89/68 (32/20)	93/72 (34/22)	93/71 (34/21)	86/64 (30/18)	76/52 (25/11)	64/41 (18/5)	55/33 (13/1)	74/52 (23/11)
Monticello	52/30 (11/-1)	58/34 (14/1)	66/43 (19/6)	74/49 (23/10)	82/59 (28/15)	89/66 (32/19)	92/70 (34/21)	92/68 (33/20)	86/62 (30/17)	76/50 (25/10)	64/41 (18/5)	55/34 (13/1)	74/51 (23/10)
Fort Smith	48/27 (8/-2)	54/32 (12/0)	64/40 (17/4)	73/49 (22/9)	80/58 (26/14)	87/67 (30/19)	92/71 (33/21)	92/70 (33/21)	84/62 (29/17)	75/50 (23/10)	61/39 (16/4)	50/31 (10/0)	72/50 (22/10)
Average high °F/average low °F (average high °C/average low°C)

Climate data for Little Rock (Clinton National Airport), 1991−2020 normals, (Note: Mean monthly maxima and minima (i.e. the expected highest and lowest temperature readings at any point during the year or given month) calculated based on data at said location from 1991 to 2020.) extremes 1879−present (Note: Official records for Little Rock began on 1 July 1879 at the State Capitol and maintained there until 30 April 1942. The next day, and until 7 August 1942, temperature and precipitation were recorded separately at two different locations in and around Little Rock, and the official climatology station has been Adams Field since 8 August 1942. For more information, see Threadex)
Month	Jan	Feb	Mar	Apr	May	Jun	Jul	Aug	Sep	Oct	Nov	Dec	Year
Record high °F (°C)	83 (28)	87 (31)	91 (33)	95 (35)	98 (37)	107 (42)	112 (44)	114 (46)	106 (41)	98 (37)	86 (30)	81 (27)	114 (46)
Mean maximum °F (°C)	72.0 (22.2)	75.8 (24.3)	82.2 (27.9)	86.2 (30.1)	91.3 (32.9)	96.2 (35.7)	100.2 (37.9)	101.1 (38.4)	96.2 (35.7)	89.2 (31.8)	79.6 (26.4)	72.8 (22.7)	102.4 (39.1)
Mean daily maximum °F (°C)	50.5 (10.3)	55.2 (12.9)	63.7 (17.6)	72.8 (22.7)	80.5 (26.9)	88.2 (31.2)	91.7 (33.2)	91.5 (33.1)	85.1 (29.5)	74.2 (23.4)	61.9 (16.6)	52.6 (11.4)	72.3 (22.4)
Daily mean °F (°C)	40.7 (4.8)	44.7 (7.1)	52.7 (11.5)	61.4 (16.3)	69.9 (21.1)	78.0 (25.6)	81.4 (27.4)	80.8 (27.1)	74.0 (23.3)	62.6 (17.0)	51.1 (10.6)	43.0 (6.1)	61.7 (16.5)
Mean daily minimum °F (°C)	30.9 (−0.6)	34.2 (1.2)	41.8 (5.4)	50.1 (10.1)	59.3 (15.2)	67.7 (19.8)	71.2 (21.8)	70.1 (21.2)	62.9 (17.2)	50.9 (10.5)	40.2 (4.6)	33.3 (0.7)	51.0 (10.6)
Mean minimum °F (°C)	16.4 (−8.7)	20.5 (−6.4)	26.6 (−3.0)	36.9 (2.7)	47.2 (8.4)	59.8 (15.4)	65.6 (18.7)	63.8 (17.7)	50.4 (10.2)	37.1 (2.8)	26.4 (−3.1)	20.3 (−6.5)	13.6 (−10.2)
Record low °F (°C)	−8 (−22)	−12 (−24)	11 (−12)	28 (−2)	38 (3)	46 (8)	54 (12)	52 (11)	37 (3)	27 (−3)	10 (−12)	−1 (−18)	−12 (−24)
Average precipitation inches (mm)	3.50 (89)	3.97 (101)	4.96 (126)	5.59 (142)	5.08 (129)	3.55 (90)	3.33 (85)	3.16 (80)	3.01 (76)	4.47 (114)	4.72 (120)	5.08 (129)	50.42 (1,281)
Average snowfall inches (cm)	1.1 (2.8)	1.6 (4.1)	0.5 (1.3)	0.0 (0.0)	0.0 (0.0)	0.0 (0.0)	0.0 (0.0)	0.0 (0.0)	0.0 (0.0)	0.0 (0.0)	0.0 (0.0)	0.6 (1.5)	3.8 (9.7)
Average extreme snow depth inches (cm)	1 (2.5)	1 (2.5)	0 (0)	0 (0)	0 (0)	0 (0)	0 (0)	0 (0)	0 (0)	0 (0)	0 (0)	1 (2.5)	1 (2.5)
Average precipitation days (≥ 0.01 in)	9.2	9.3	10.5	9.4	10.9	8.0	8.7	7.2	6.6	8.1	8.5	9.5	105.9
Average snowy days (≥ 0.1 in)	0.5	0.9	0.4	0.0	0.0	0.0	0.0	0.0	0.0	0.0	0.1	0.3	2.2
Average relative humidity (%)	70.2	68.3	65.4	66.7	71.1	70.0	71.6	71.7	73.5	70.4	71.0	70.9	70.1
Average dew point °F (°C)	28.9 (−1.7)	32.4 (0.2)	40.3 (4.6)	49.6 (9.8)	59.2 (15.1)	66.2 (19.0)	70.2 (21.2)	68.5 (20.3)	63.1 (17.3)	51.1 (10.6)	41.7 (5.4)	32.7 (0.4)	50.3 (10.2)
Mean monthly sunshine hours	180.9	188.2	244.5	276.7	325.3	346.2	351.0	323.0	271.9	251.0	176.9	166.2	3,101.8
Percentage possible sunshine	58	62	66	71	75	80	80	78	73	72	57	54	70
Average ultraviolet index	2.5	3.8	5.7	7.6	8.9	9.6	9.8	8.9	7.2	4.9	3.0	2.3	6.1
Source 1: NOAA (relative humidity and dew point 1961-1990, sun 1961−1990 at North Little Rock Airport)
Source 2: UV Index Today (1995 to 2022)

Climate data for Fayetteville, Arkansas (1991–2020 normals, extremes 1892–present)
Month	Jan	Feb	Mar	Apr	May	Jun	Jul	Aug	Sep	Oct	Nov	Dec	Year
Record high °F (°C)	76 (24)	86 (30)	96 (36)	96 (36)	95 (35)	104 (40)	111 (44)	109 (43)	105 (41)	96 (36)	90 (32)	78 (26)	111 (44)
Mean daily maximum °F (°C)	46.5 (8.1)	51.2 (10.7)	59.1 (15.1)	69.0 (20.6)	75.9 (24.4)	84.1 (28.9)	88.7 (31.5)	86.6 (30.3)	81.4 (27.4)	70.9 (21.6)	58.6 (14.8)	49.6 (9.8)	68.6 (20.3)
Daily mean °F (°C)	36.7 (2.6)	40.6 (4.8)	48.5 (9.2)	58.1 (14.5)	66.0 (18.9)	74.8 (23.8)	79.1 (26.2)	78.1 (25.6)	70.6 (21.4)	59.4 (15.2)	48.1 (8.9)	39.7 (4.3)	58.3 (14.6)
Mean daily minimum °F (°C)	26.9 (−2.8)	30.0 (−1.1)	37.9 (3.3)	47.2 (8.4)	56.2 (13.4)	65.5 (18.6)	69.4 (20.8)	67.7 (19.8)	59.8 (15.4)	47.9 (8.8)	37.7 (3.2)	29.8 (−1.2)	48.0 (8.9)
Record low °F (°C)	−23 (−31)	−24 (−31)	−11 (−24)	18 (−8)	28 (−2)	39 (4)	48 (9)	44 (7)	29 (−2)	17 (−8)	5 (−15)	−12 (−24)	−24 (−31)
Average precipitation inches (mm)	2.57 (65)	2.31 (59)	3.74 (95)	4.51 (115)	6.01 (153)	4.68 (119)	3.59 (91)	3.44 (87)	4.53 (115)	4.05 (103)	3.99 (101)	2.86 (73)	46.28 (1,176)
Average precipitation days (≥ 0.01 in)	6.3	6.9	7.3	8.6	11.1	8.4	7.2	7.1	7.1	7.6	6.7	6.2	90.5
Source: NOAA

== Hydrology ==
The Natural Resources Conservation Service has noted that amounts of rainfall in Arkansas are characterized by marked differences along a northeast/southwest dividing line. The northeast is characterized as arid-semiarid climate, and the southwest as a Gulf-influenced humid-subhumid climate. The area that receives the most rain in the state is the area south of the Ouachita Mountains, which form an orographic effect (commonly known as rain shadow) when storms move north from the Gulf.

The Arkansas Department of Environmental Quality (ADEQ) describes Arkansas's water resources by using six ecoregions. Of the six, the Boston Mountain, Ouachita Mountain and Ozark Highlands ecoregions generally contain waterways with "exceptionally high quality water", including many of the state's extraordinary resources waters (ERWs). The Arkansas River Valley, Gulf Coastal and Delta ecoregions have seen adverse water quality effects from agriculture and silviculture but are generally compliant with the goals of the Clean Water Act.

=== Surface water ===
Arkansas contains approximately 515,000 acres (208,000 ha) of surface waters, including 28,408 miles (45,718 km) of perennial streams and 87,618 miles (141,008 km) of total streams. ADEQ uses six ultimate receiving streams to subdivide the state into primary watersheds: Arkansas River, Mississippi River, Ouachita River, Red River, St. Francis River, and White River. This six basins collect water from over 1600 smaller watersheds throughout the state via tributary streams, as described below.

- Arkansas River: flows south-southeast, roughly bisecting the state. Major tributaries include Bayou Meto, Cadron Creek, Fourche LaFave River, Petit Jean River, Poteau River, and Illinois River.
- Mississippi River: flows south and forms much of the state's eastern boundary on its way to the Gulf of Mexico. Major tributaries include the Arkansas, St. Francis, and White.
- Ouachita River: flows southeast into Louisiana. Major tributaries include the Antoine River, Boeuf River, Bayou Bartholomew, Little Missouri River, and the Saline River.
- Red River: located in southwest Arkansas, flows southeast into Louisiana. Major tributaries include: Dorcheat Bayou, Bodcau Bayou, Lower Middle Red River, Lower Red River, Sulphur River, McKinney Bayou, Little River, and Mountain Fork
- St. Francis River: located in northeast Arkansas, flows east into the Mississippi River. Major tributaries include the L'Anguille River and Little River.
- White River: flows from northwest to southeast Arkansas, including a brief turn into Missouri. Major tributaries include Bayou De View, Bayou des Arc, Black River, Buffalo River, Cache River, Eleven Point River, Kings River, Little Red River, Spring River, Strawberry River, Village Creek, Wattensaw Bayou.
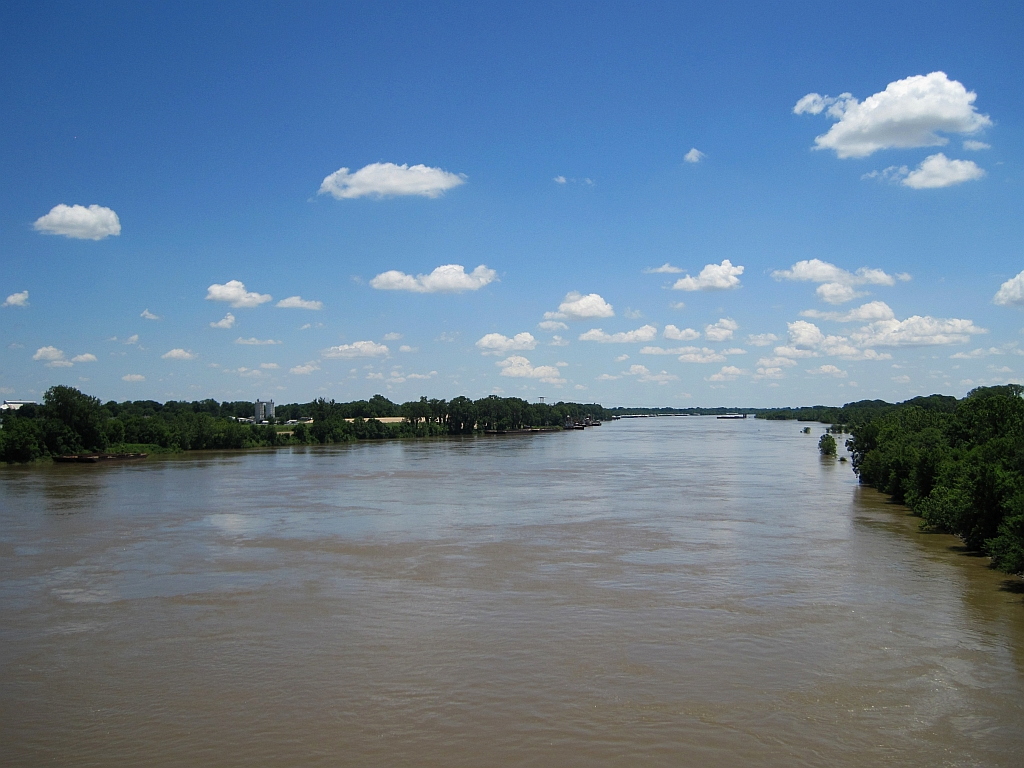
Arkansas River
at Little Rock

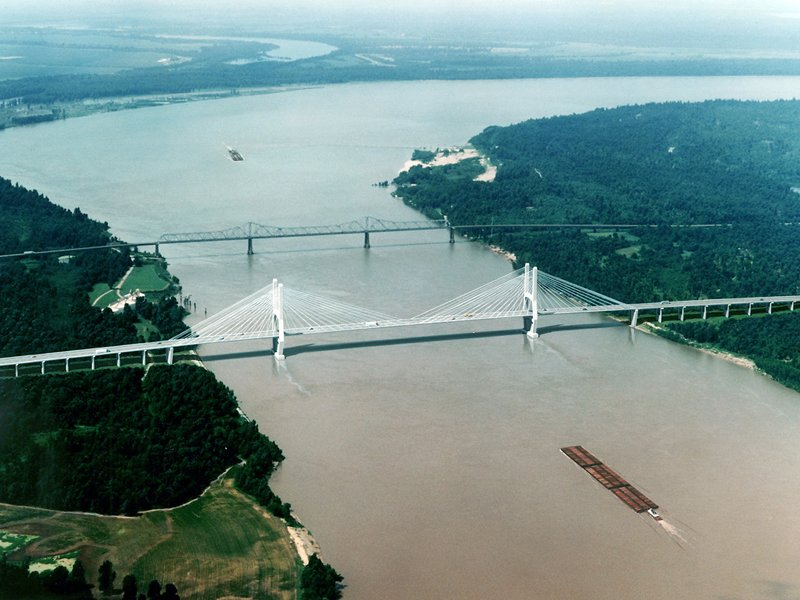
Mississippi River
at Lake Village

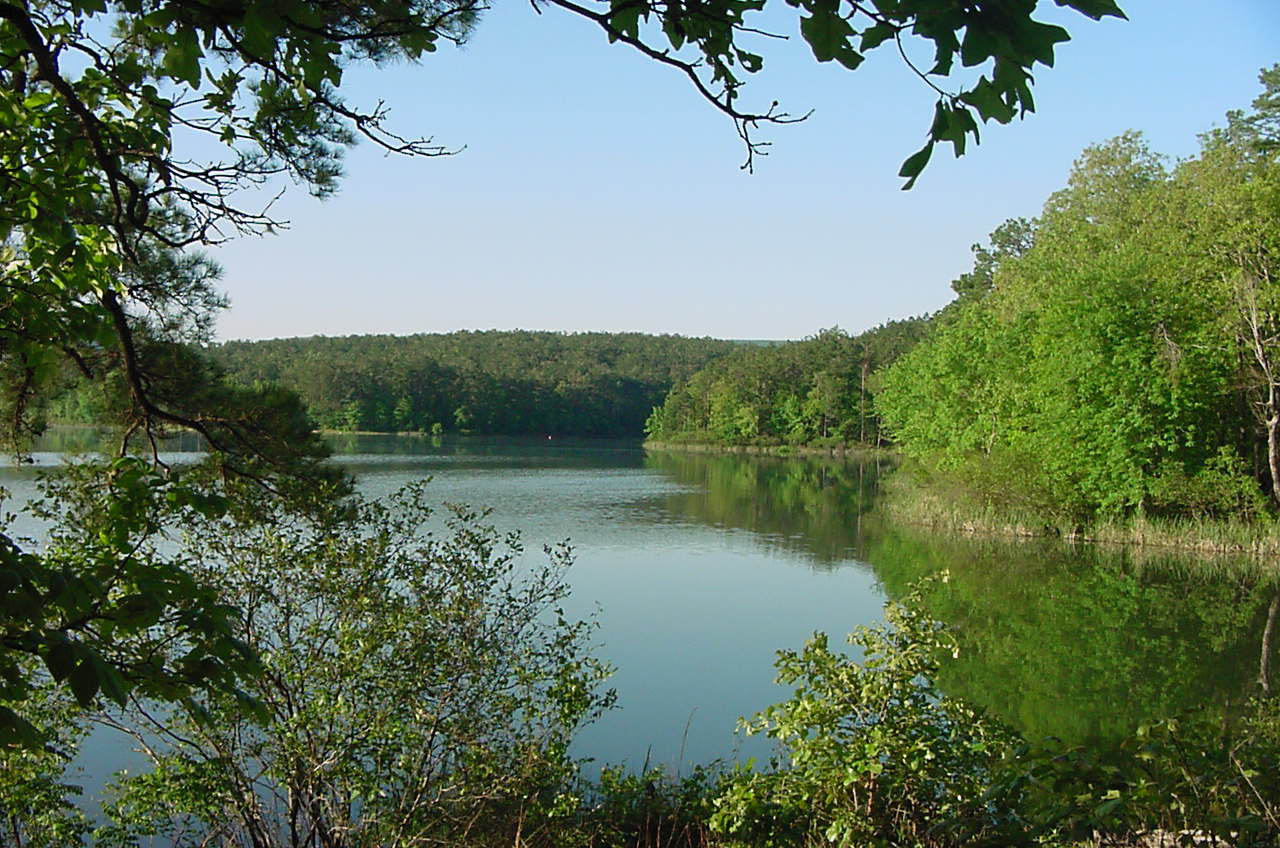
Ouachita River in the
Ouachita National Forest

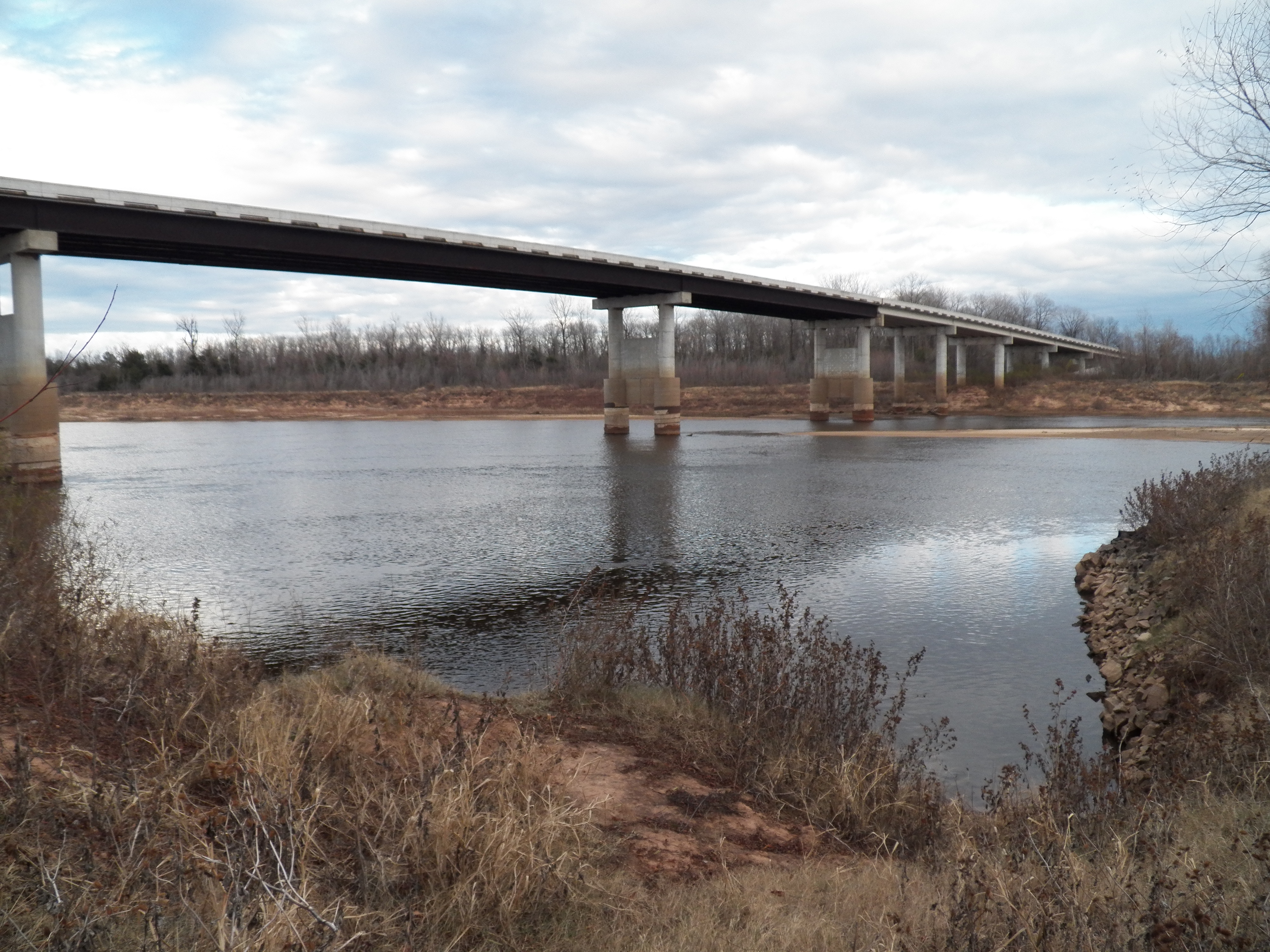
Red River
at Lewisville

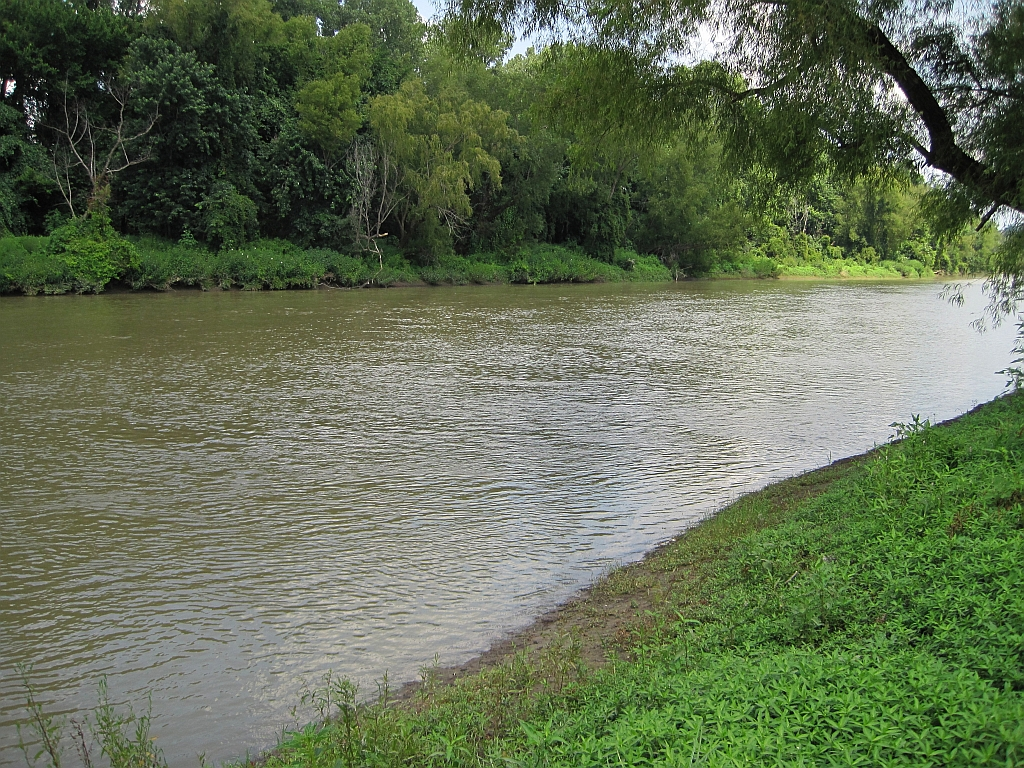
St. Francis River
at Parkin

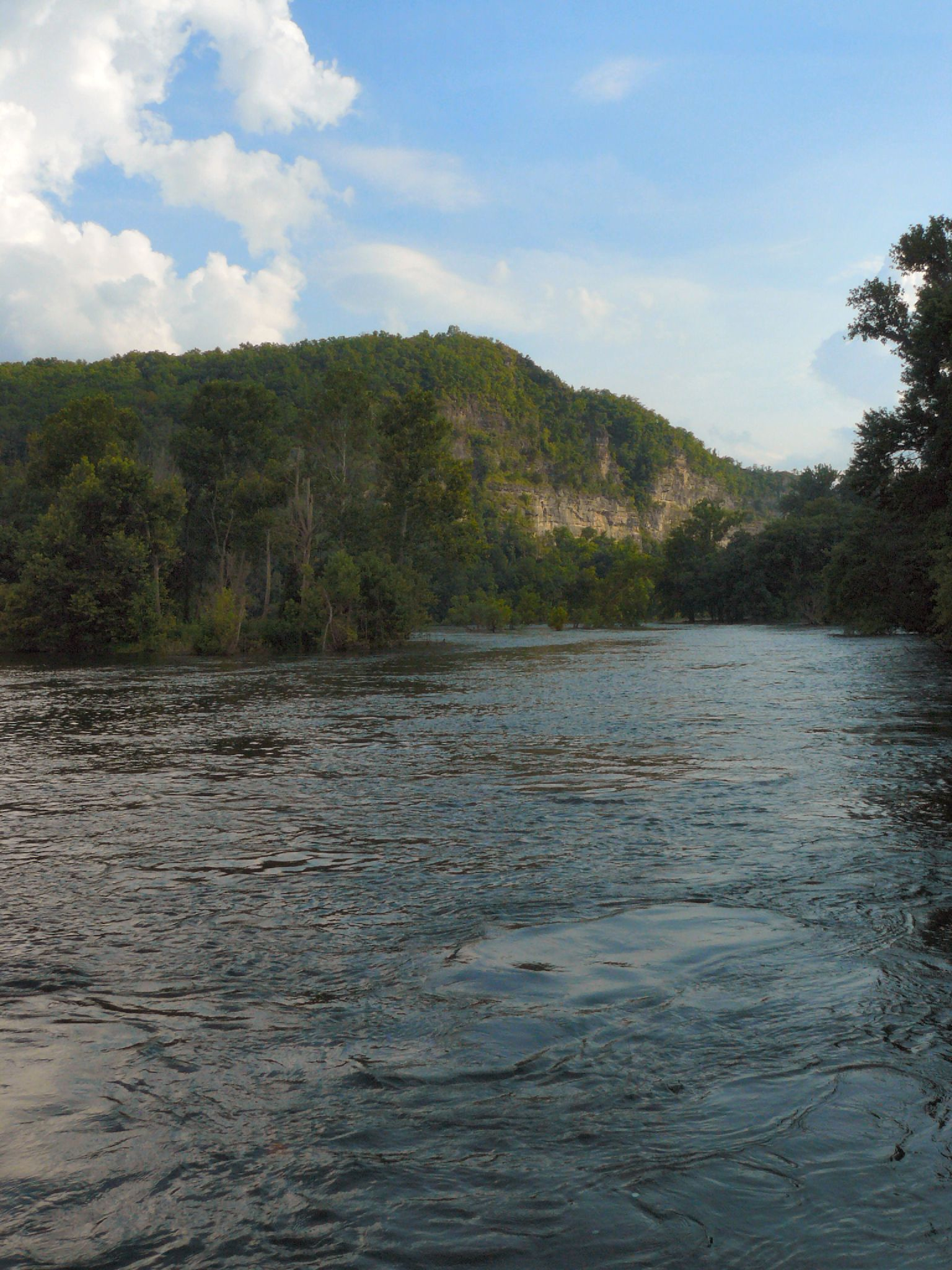
White River
at Buffalo City

=== Groundwater ===
Groundwater accounts for over 60% of water use in Arkansas, and shallow aquifers providing high quality groundwater can be found throughout the state. In many upland regions of Arkansas, surface water interacts with groundwater via karst topography common to the Ozarks and Ouachitas. Groundwater monitoring is subdivided into twelve areas. Of the twelve, the Athens Plateau (Hempstead County), Frontal Ouachita, Hardy, Omaha, Ouachita, North Central, and Pine Bluff monitoring areas have a water quality described as "generally good".

== Protected areas ==
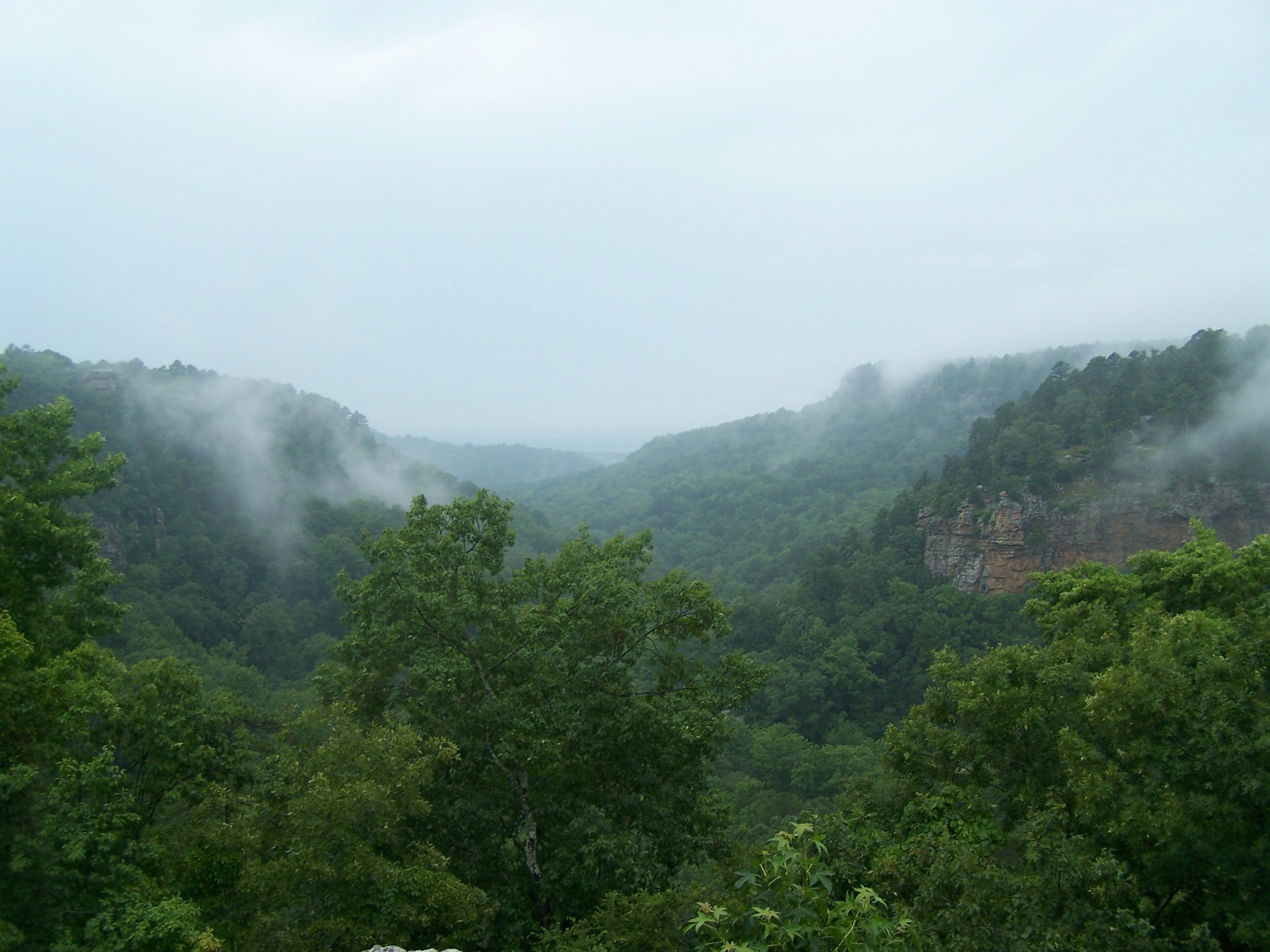
View from Mather Lodge at Petit Jean State Park

Arkansas has many protected natural areas administered by several different organizations. The Ozark Mountain forests have been subdivided into the Ozark National Forest, St. Francis National Forest, and the Ouachita National Forest, maintained by the United States Forest Service. The Forest Service also maintains the Black Fork Mountain Wilderness, Blanchard Springs Caverns, and several other recreational areas within the forests.

Administered by the National Park Service (NPS), Hot Springs National Park was the nation's first national park. The park includes structures from when it was a flourishing resort: Bathhouse Row is a formerly bustling avenue of Gilded Age architecture bathhouses; each drew on the spring water of the site with claims to cure dozens of ailments. There was also a racetrack and associated resort nearby.

The NPS also maintains three National Historic Sites in Arkansas: Fort Smith National Historic Site, Little Rock Central High School, and the President Clinton Birthplace. Pea Ridge National Military Park is the only National Military Park, and Arkansas Post National Memorial is the only National Memorial in the state.

The Arkansas Department of Parks and Tourism maintains 52 state parks in Arkansas as well as Poison Springs State Forest. Parks range from large forested areas for hiking enthusiasts, to lakes and rivers for watersports, to interpretive historical sites, to cemeteries celebrating historically significant Arkansans. Some of the most frequently visited parks include Mount Magazine State Park, DeGray Lake Resort State Park, Crater of Diamonds State Park, Pinnacle Mountain State Park, Petit Jean State Park, Devil's Den State Park, Crowley's Ridge State Park, and Lake Ouachita State Park.

== See also ==
- Arkansas Geological Survey
