= Village Creek State Park (Arkansas) =

State park in Cross and St. Francis counties, Arkansas

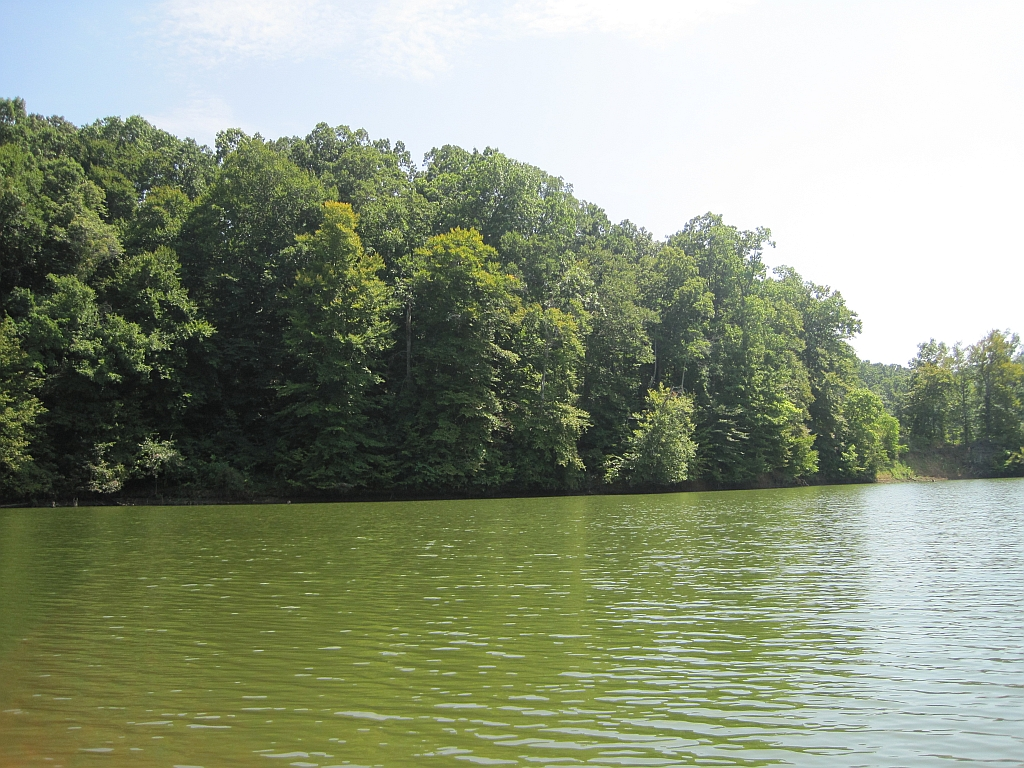
- Lake Dunn

- Location within Arkansas Location within the United States
- Interactive map of Village Creek State Park
- Location: Cross and St. Francis counties, Arkansas, United States
- Coordinates: 35°09′48″N 90°43′08″W
- Area: 6,909 acres (2,796 ha)
- Established: June 27, 1976
- Administrator: Arkansas Department of Parks, Heritage and Tourism
- Website: Official website
- Arkansas State Parks

Village Creek State Park is a 6,909-acre (2,796 ha) Arkansas state park in Cross and St. Francis counties, Arkansas in the United States. The park was formed as a result of a study commissioned by the Arkansas General Assembly to form a large park in east Arkansas. Segments of the Old Military Road, later used as the Trail of Tears run through the park, which also features two lakes and 27 holes of golf.

== History ==
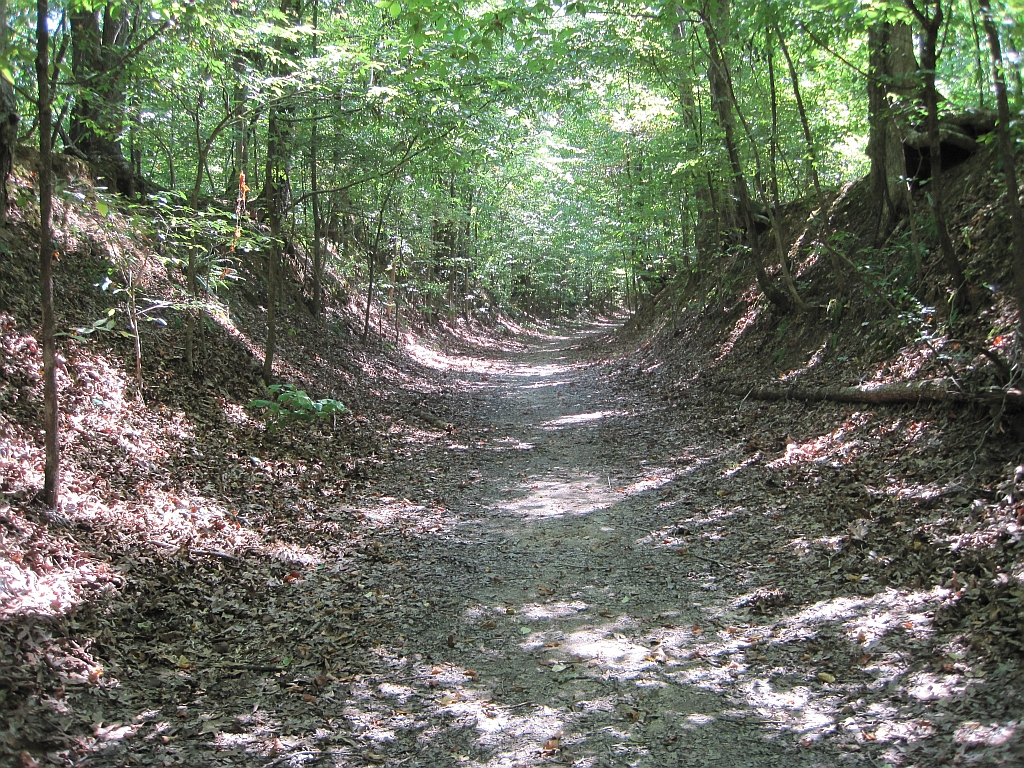
Old Military Road/Trail of Tears running through Village Creek State Park

The Arkansas General Assembly authorized a study in 1967 in the interests of forming a recreational area in eastern Arkansas. In addition to the natural value, the Village Creek area contained the historically significant Old Military Road, later used as the Trail of Tears, and parts of William Strong's mid-1800s plantation. Land acquisition began in 1972, and the park was dedicated on June 27, 1976 in a large ceremony including David Pryor and Charlie Rich.

== Recreation ==
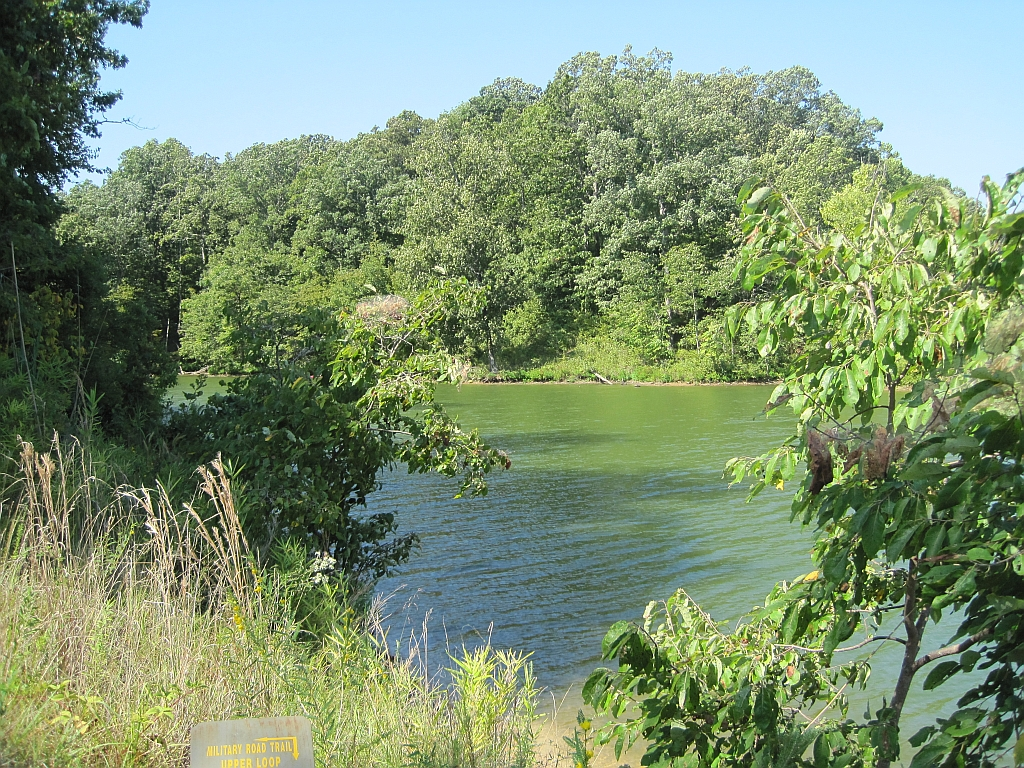
Lake Austell

Village Creek State Park offers two lakes for boating and fishing, Lake Austell and Lake Dunn. Fishers will find bass, bream, catfish, and crappie, and boat rentals are available between Memorial Day and Labor Day. There are 10 modern cabins, ranging from one to three bedrooms in addition to 96 campsites (24 premium class A, 5 standard class A, 67 Class B). Campers also have access to five modern bathhouses, a swimming beach, boat dock, and playground.

Picnic tables, grills, and bathhouses are available at Lake Austell Day Use Area, and four pavilions are available for rent. The visitor center includes interpretive displays about the culture, history, and wildlife of Crowley's Ridge and information on the four tribes forced to use the Trail of Tears. An auditorium, grocery store and gift shop are also housed in the visitor's complex. The 27 hole Ridges at Village Creek golf course is accessible from the pro shop. Seven trails, including Big Ben Nature Trail and Austell Hiking Trail are available for hiking or walking, in addition to the Military Road Trail, a part of the congressionally designated Trail of Tears National Historic Trail.

Four other state parks accompany Village Creek State Park atop Crowley's Ridge: Crowley's Ridge State Park, Lake Frierson State Park, Parkin Archeological State Park, and Lake Poinsett State Park are all nearby.
