= Lake Fort Smith State Park =

State park in Arkansas, United States

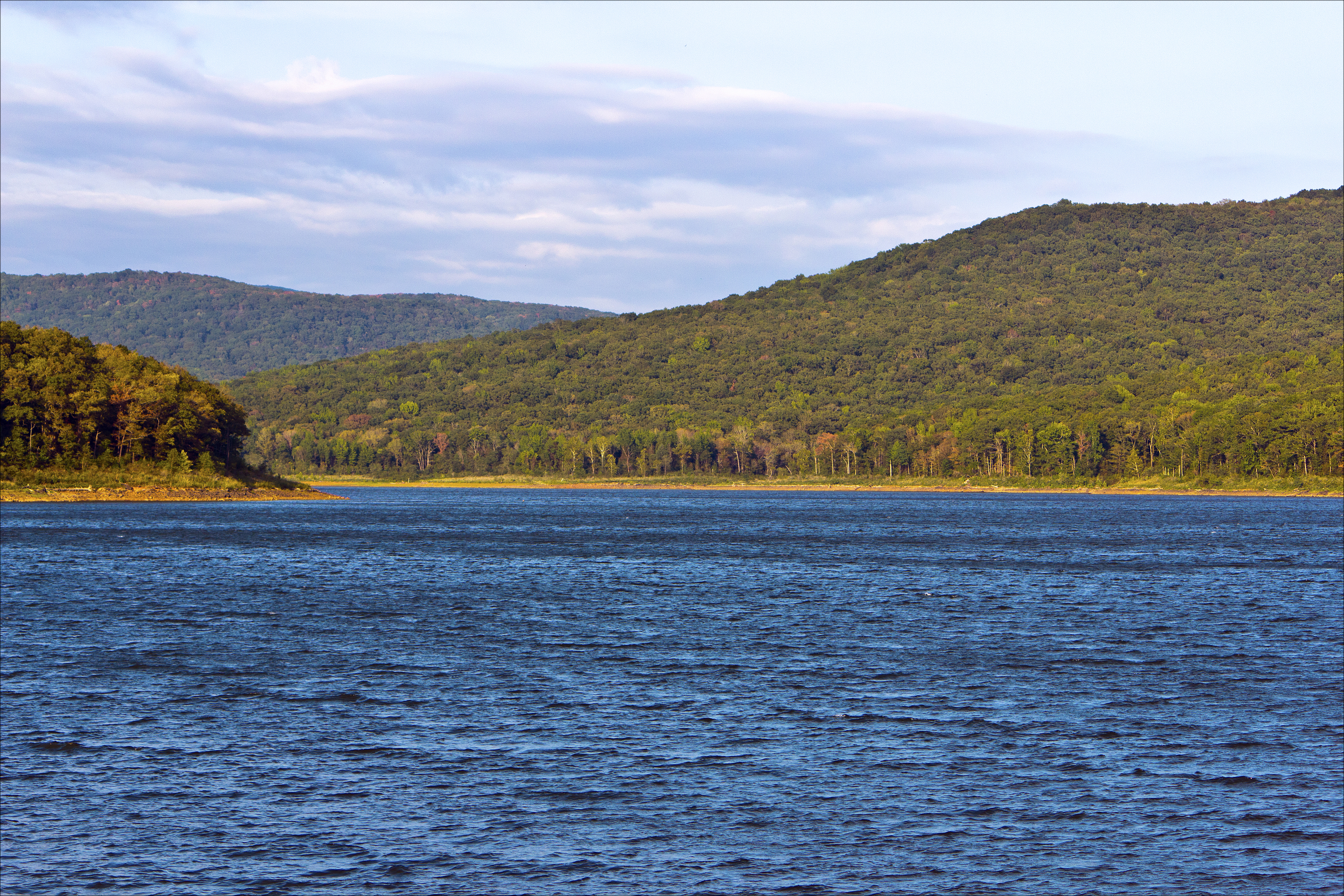

- Location within Arkansas Location within the United States
- Interactive map of Lake Fort Smith State Park
- Location: Crawford County, Arkansas, United States
- Coordinates: 35°41′43″N 94°07′07″W
- Area: 260 acres (110 ha)
- Established: 1967; reopened 2008
- Administrator: Arkansas Department of Parks, Heritage and Tourism
- Website: Official website
- Arkansas State Parks

Lake Fort Smith State Park is a 260-acre (110 ha) Arkansas state park in Crawford County, Arkansas in the United States. Originally a Fort Smith city park in the 1930s and later the Works Progress Administration–built Mountainburg Recreational Facility, the lake nestled in the Boston Mountains was adopted into the state park system by the Arkansas Department of Parks and Tourism in 1967. Lake Fort Smith State Park was closed in 2002 to make way for a larger dam and spillway. The addition flooded the site of the old park, and the new 260 acres (110 ha) Lake Fort Smith State Park reopened May 21, 2008 4 miles (6.4 km) north of its original location with 30 campsites, 10 cabins, a group lodging facility, picnic sites, a pavilion, marina with rental boats, a double lane boat ramp, a swimming pool, playground, and an 8,000 square feet (740 m^{2}) visitor center with exhibit gallery, gift shop, a meeting/class room, a patio with an outdoor wood-burning fireplace, and an expansive view of the lake and mountains.
