= Lake Poinsett State Park =

State park in Arkansas, United States

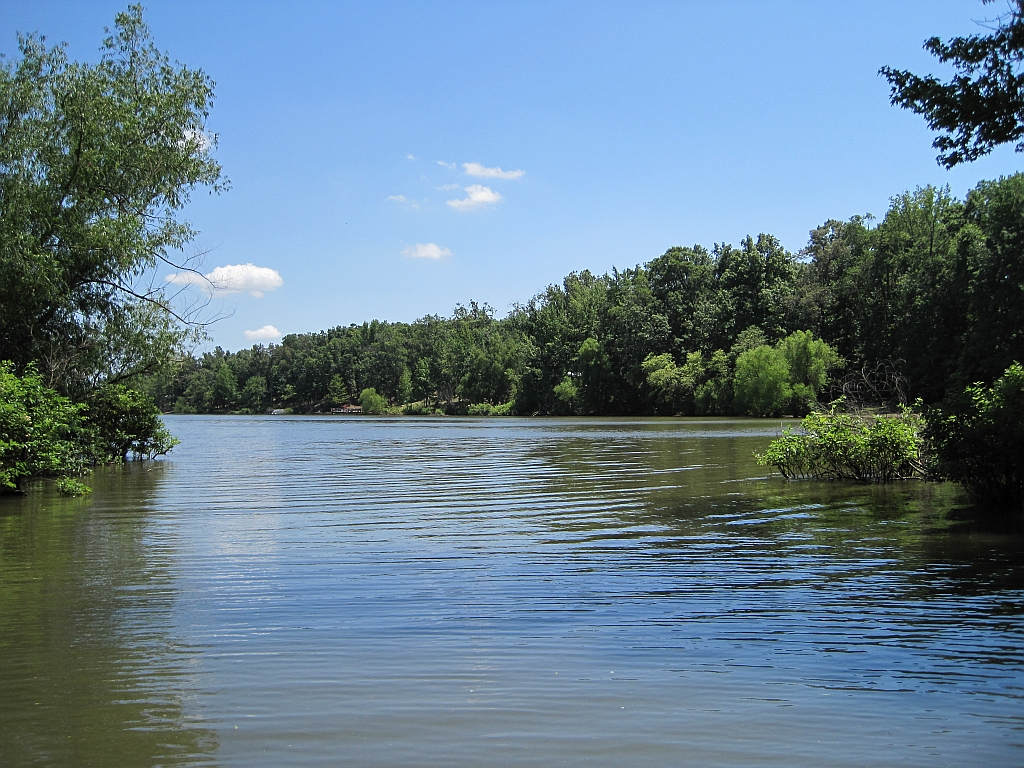

- Location within Arkansas Location within the United States
- Interactive map of Lake Poinsett State Park
- Location: Poinsett County, Arkansas, United States
- Coordinates: 35°31′57″N 90°41′14″W
- Area: 132 acres (53 ha)
- Established: 1963
- Administrator: Arkansas Department of Parks, Heritage and Tourism
- Website: Official website
- Arkansas State Parks

Lake Poinsett State Park is a 132-acre (53 ha) Arkansas state park on Crowley's Ridge in Poinsett County, Arkansas in the United States. The park was formed after the damming of Distress Creek to create a recreational lake in the county in 1960. The park is located along the western bank of the lake and features camping, fishing, picnicking and boat rentals.

== History ==
Activists in Harrisburg and elsewhere in Poinsett County began efforts to obtain a recreational lake in their area in the 1950s, but their efforts were not successful due to a lack of funds. The idea was adopted by the Arkansas Game and Fish Commission, who made plans to dam Distress Creek as funds became available, but the money would not come through until former Arkansas highway commissioner Dan Portis discussed the plan with Arkansas governor Orval Faubus. The dam became a reality in 1960, and was named for Poinsett County.

The idea for a state park came from locals Richard Woods and L. K. Collier, who donated 40 acres (16 ha) of land toward a park. Locals raised enough money to double the donation of land to the Arkansas State Parks, Recreation and Travel Commission, who deemed the land big enough for a park and accepted the donation on June 21, 1963, making Lake Poinsett State Park the 20th state park in Arkansas.

== Recreation ==
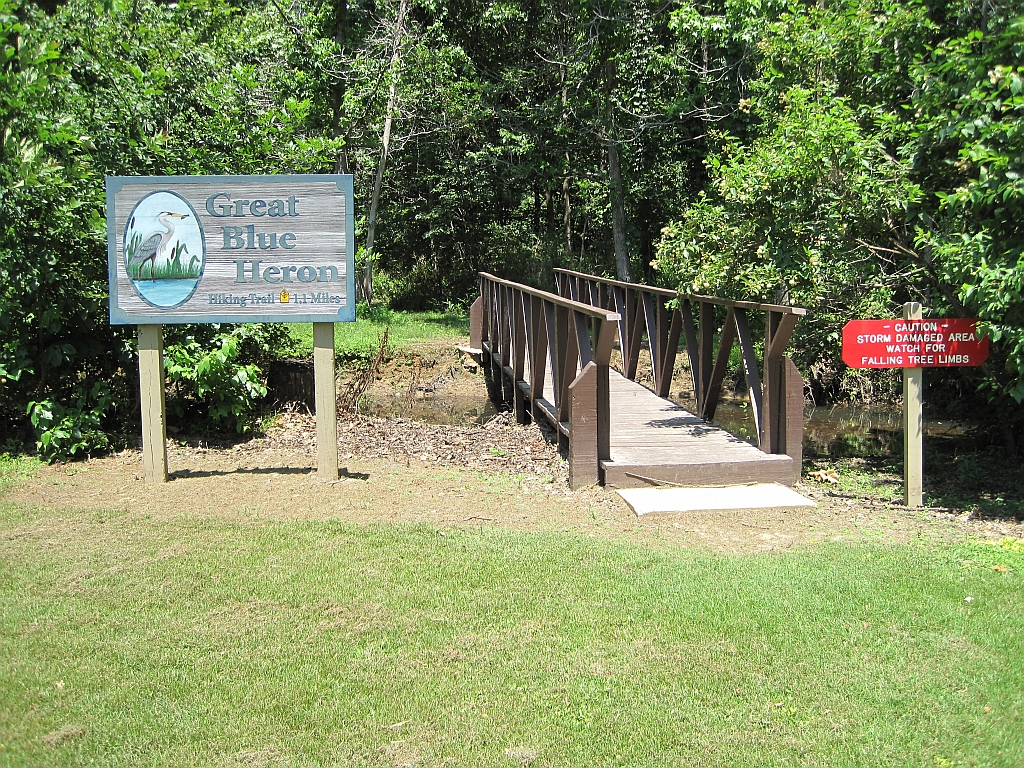
Beginning of the Great Blue Heron biking trail in the park

Fishers will find bass, bream, catfish, and crappie in the lake's shallow waters. The park offers 29 campsites (4 class A, 22 Class B, and 3 tent sites), but does not contain any other types of cabin or lodging. A pavilion with restrooms is available near the campsites. Park interpreters guide visitors along trail walks in addition to wildlife and birding tours. Kayaking and canoe tours on the lake are also guided by park interpreters seasonally. The Great Blue Heron Trail is a 1.1 miles (1.8 km) hiking trail that beginning near the children's playground and winds in a loop through the woods. Picnic tables are scattered throughout the park in open areas.

Four other state parks accompany Lake Poinsett State Park atop Crowley's Ridge: Crowley's Ridge State Park, Lake Frierson State Park, Parkin Archeological State Park, and Village Creek State Park are all nearby.
