= Daisy State Park =

State park in Pike County, Arkansas, United States

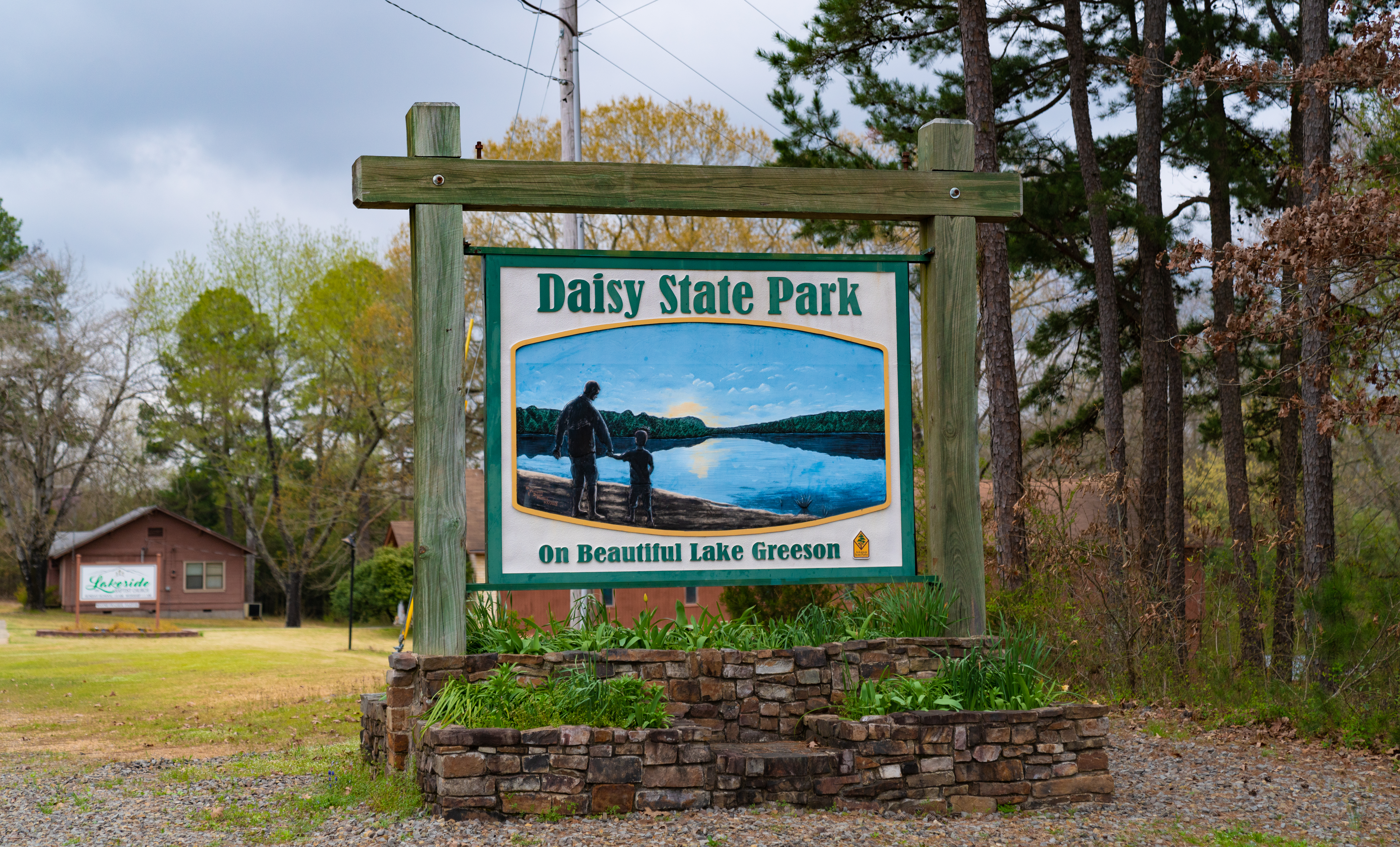

- Location within Arkansas Location within the United States
- Interactive map of Daisy State Park
- Location: Pike County, Arkansas, United States
- Coordinates: 34°14′02″N 93°44′27″W
- Area: 276 acres (112 ha)
- Established: 1955
- Administrator: Arkansas Department of Parks, Heritage and Tourism
- Website: Official website
- Arkansas State Parks

Daisy State Park is a 276-acre (112 ha) Arkansas state park in Pike County, Arkansas in the United States. The park at the foothills of the Ouachita Mountains features Lake Greeson, a 7,000-acre (2,800 ha) fishing lake constructed by the United States Army Corps of Engineers in 1950. The park is surrounded by timberlands and is located near the Ouachita National Forest.

== See also ==
- Cossatot River State Park-Natural Area
- Crater of Diamonds State Park
