= Lake Charles State Park =

State park in Lawrence County, Arkansas

- Swimming beach from Lake Charles

- Location within Arkansas Location within the United States
- Interactive map of Lake Charles State Park
- Location: Lawrence County, Arkansas, United States
- Coordinates: 36°03′56″N 91°09′10″W
- Area: 140 acres (57 ha)
- Established: 1967
- Administrator: Arkansas Department of Parks, Heritage and Tourism
- Website: Official website
- Arkansas State Parks

Lake Charles State Park is a 140-acre (57 ha) Arkansas state park in Lawrence County, Arkansas in the United States. Situated in The Ozarks along the Black River, the park features the 645-acre (261 ha) artificial Lake Charles. The lake is a result of a partnership of four agencies to construct a multipurpose lake just north of Shirey Bay Rainey Brake Wildlife Management Area in an effort to control flooding and preserve the watershed. Construction on the lake began in 1964, and the park was dedicated in 1967.

== History ==
The original idea for a lake came in 1954 when the Lawrence County Soil and Water Conservation District Board of Supervisors applied to the U.S. Department of Agriculture’s Watershed Protection and Flood Prevention Program in the interest of protecting the watershed and preventing flooding downstream. However, the Small Watershed Act was passed before any action could be taken. This allowed for construction that benefited fish and wildlife development. The plans for Lake Charles were changed to that the Shirey Bay Rainey Brake Wildlife Management Area immediately to the south could be supplied with fresh water during hot summer months. The Arkansas Game and Fish Commission (AGFC) owns and operates all Wildlife Management Areas in Arkansas and became supporters of Lake Charles' construction. Locals showed their support by forming the Flat Creek Watershed Improvement District and obtaining a loan from the Farmers Home Administration. The Publicity and Parks Commission pledged to maintain the lake as Lake Charles State Park and construction began in 1964. Official dedication of Lake Charles State Park took place on May 28, 1967.

== Recreation ==
Lake Charles State Park offers many different opportunities for outdoors enthusiasts including fishing, camping, swimming, and hiking. The lake is maintained by the AGFC, who stock catfish, crappie, largemouth bass, white bass, and others. Camping is available at any of Lake Charles' 61 campsites (23 class AAA, 37 class B, one RV). Lake Charles State Park offers four trails for walking and hiking, ranging from easy to moderate difficulty. Spread throughout the park are picnic areas, a playground, a screened-in pavilion with fans, fishing and boat docks, an interpretive nature center and gift shop.
