= Small Watershed Program =

The Small Watershed Program is a program created under the Watershed Protection and Flood Prevention Act (P.L. 83–566), and 1 of 3 programs that are combined into the Watershed and Flood Prevention Operations Program. The Small Watershed Program is available in watersheds that are smaller than 250,000 acres (1,000 km^{2}). Currently, there are 515 active projects in this program.
