= Hobbs State Park – Conservation Area =

State park in Arkansas, United States

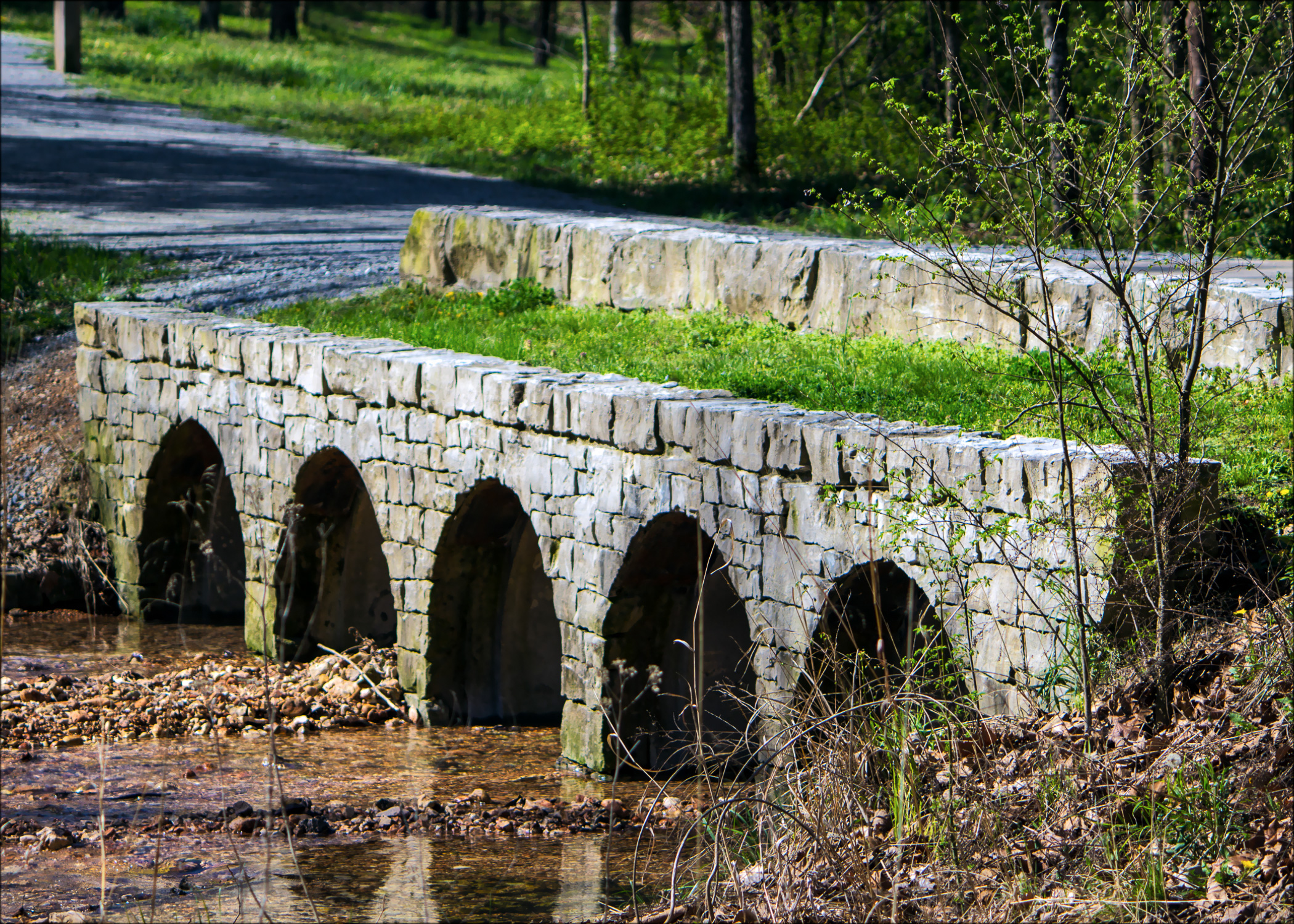
- Historic bridge leading to the Van Winkle site

- Location within Arkansas Location within the United States
- Interactive map of Hobbs State Park – Conservation Area
- Location: Benton, Carroll, and Madison counties, Arkansas, United States
- Coordinates: 36°17′06″N 93°56′20″W
- Area: 12,170 acres (4,930 ha)
- Established: 1979
- Administrator: Arkansas Department of Parks, Heritage and Tourism
- Named for: Roscoe C. Hobbs
- Website: Official website
- Arkansas State Parks

Hobbs State Park – Conservation Area (formerly known as Beaver Lake State Park and Hobbs State Management Area) is a 12,056-acre (4,879 ha) Arkansas state park in Benton, Carroll, and Madison Counties, Arkansas in the United States. The park was bought in 1979 through a huge financial effort from Northwest Arkansas banks. Hobbs State Park – Conservation Area is located almost entirely in the Springfield Plateau subdivision of the Ozark Plateau. The park, located just south of Beaver Lake, is open for year-round recreation, including 32.9 miles (52.9 km) of hiking, mountain bike and equestrian trails. Hobbs State Park – Conservation Area also has several picnic areas, a shooting range, and primitive camping sites.

== History ==
Roscoe C. Hobbs was born in 1881 in Northwest Arkansas. He would become the manager of the Arkansas and Oklahoma Western Railroad, but made his fortune by founding the Hobbs-Western Tie Company. Hobbs' railroad tie business gave him both an appreciation of the hardwoods in the area and the money to buy many acres of undeveloped forest in the region. In 1962, Hobbs donated 320 acres (130 ha) near Huntsville to the state of Arkansas, which became Withrow Springs State Park. Upon his death, Hobbs' land was willed to his heirs with the stipulation that upon sale the state of Arkansas must have first priority to purchase it.

In 1977, the land was offered to the Arkansas Game and Fish Commission at $350/acre. In 1978, a California firm offered on the property and the deal went to escrow. Upon learning of the firm's plans to develop the land into vacation houses, citizens began to oppose the development of the area. The Game & Fish Commission did not have adequate funds to purchase the land, even though they labeled it as "highly desirable". The Arkansas Department of Parks and Tourism also wanted to purchase the land for a state park, but did not have the necessary funds. With renewed local interest, the acquisition of the park became a legislative issue, and Governor David Pryor eventually decided that the park should be obtained and protected.

In order to pay for the land, a host of organizations including the Arkansas Department of Finance and Administration, The Nature Conservancy, and Fayetteville banks joined to offer on the tract. Pryor, along with many representatives from the listed organizations, traveled to St. Louis, Missouri to negotiate with the Hobbs estate trustees. Eventually, all 22 banks in Benton, Carroll, Madison, and Washington Counties were involved in the purchase. Sam Walton, Hayden McIlroy, senators Kaneaster Hodges and Dale Bumpers and many others were instrumental in the process. The Arkansas General Assembly purchased the land from The Nature Conservancy using the money loaned from the banks (a sum of $3,175,000, loaned with 9% interest), made official by Governor Bill Clinton at a ceremony on February 19, 1979.

Because of this joint effort, the park is owned by Arkansas State Parks, the Arkansas Natural Heritage Commission, and the Arkansas Game and Fish Commission. The ownership is also reflected in the park's name.

== Geology ==
The area was historically a limestone seabed, currently being eroded by creeks, creating a classic karst topography. The park contains the springs, seeps, and disappearing streams expected with the limestone formations.

== Recreation ==
=== Camping ===
The park contains five campsites along the Pigeon Roost Trail, and six sites on the Karst Loop Trail. The sites are primitive, and some overlook Beaver Lake. Hobbs State Park – Conservation Area does not contain any other types of cabin or lodging.

=== Gun shooting range ===
Four target stands are available beginning with 25 feet (7.6 m) and increasing in 25 feet (7.6 m) intervals. The shooting station is covered and has five stations. Only paper targets are allowed and shotguns are prohibited. This is the only shooting range in an Arkansas state park.

=== Trails ===
- Shaddox Hollow Trail, 1.5 miles (2.4 km) trail in the northwest corner of the park near Arkansas Highway 303
- Pigeon Roost Trail, 8.4 miles (13.5 km) trail beginning near the visitor center on Arkansas Highway 12 Pedestrian traffic only. No bicycles or horses.
- Hidden Diversity Multi-use Trail, 23 miles (37 km) trail with guided tours available
- Historic Van Winkle Trail, 0.5 miles (0.80 km) wheelchair-accessible trail that includes a tunnel under AR 12
