= Logoly State Park =

State park in Arkansas, United States

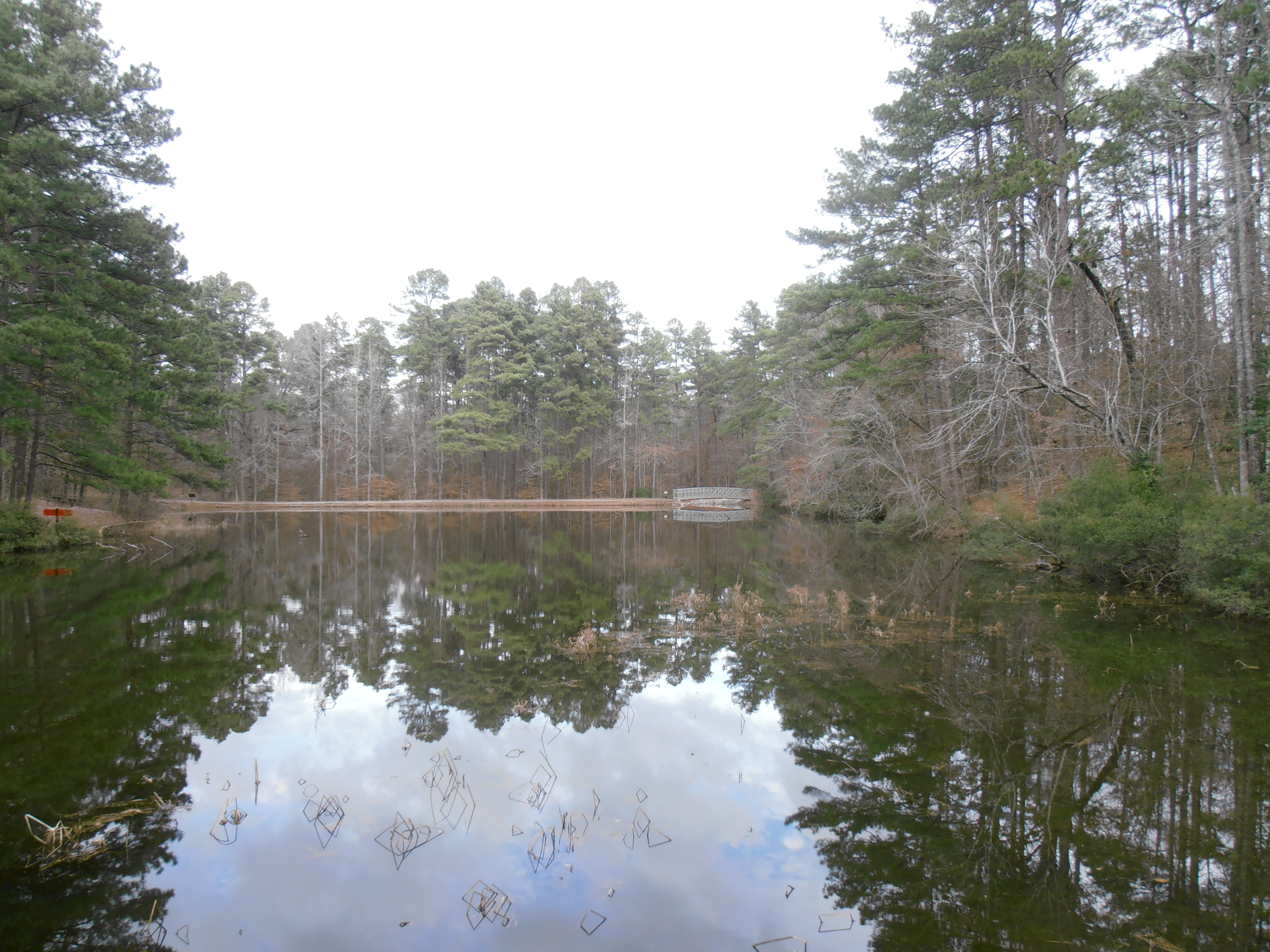
- A three-acre lake at Logoly State Park

- Location within Arkansas Location within the United States
- Interactive map of Logoly State Park
- Location: Columbia County, Arkansas, United States
- Coordinates: 33°20′49″N 93°11′01″W
- Area: 368 acres (149 ha)
- Established: May 19, 1978
- Administrator: Arkansas Department of Parks, Heritage and Tourism
- Website: Official website
- Arkansas State Parks

Logoly State Park is a unit of the Arkansas state parks system located in the Gulf Coastal Plain, 6 miles (10 km) north of Magnolia, 0.75 miles (1.2 km) east of McNeil, off U.S. Route 79 on Logoly Road (County Road 47) in southwestern Arkansas in the United States. The 368-acre (1.49 km^{2}) park surrounds an area of mineral springs that have been known for over a century.
