= Cane Creek State Park =

State park in Lincoln County, Arkansas, United States

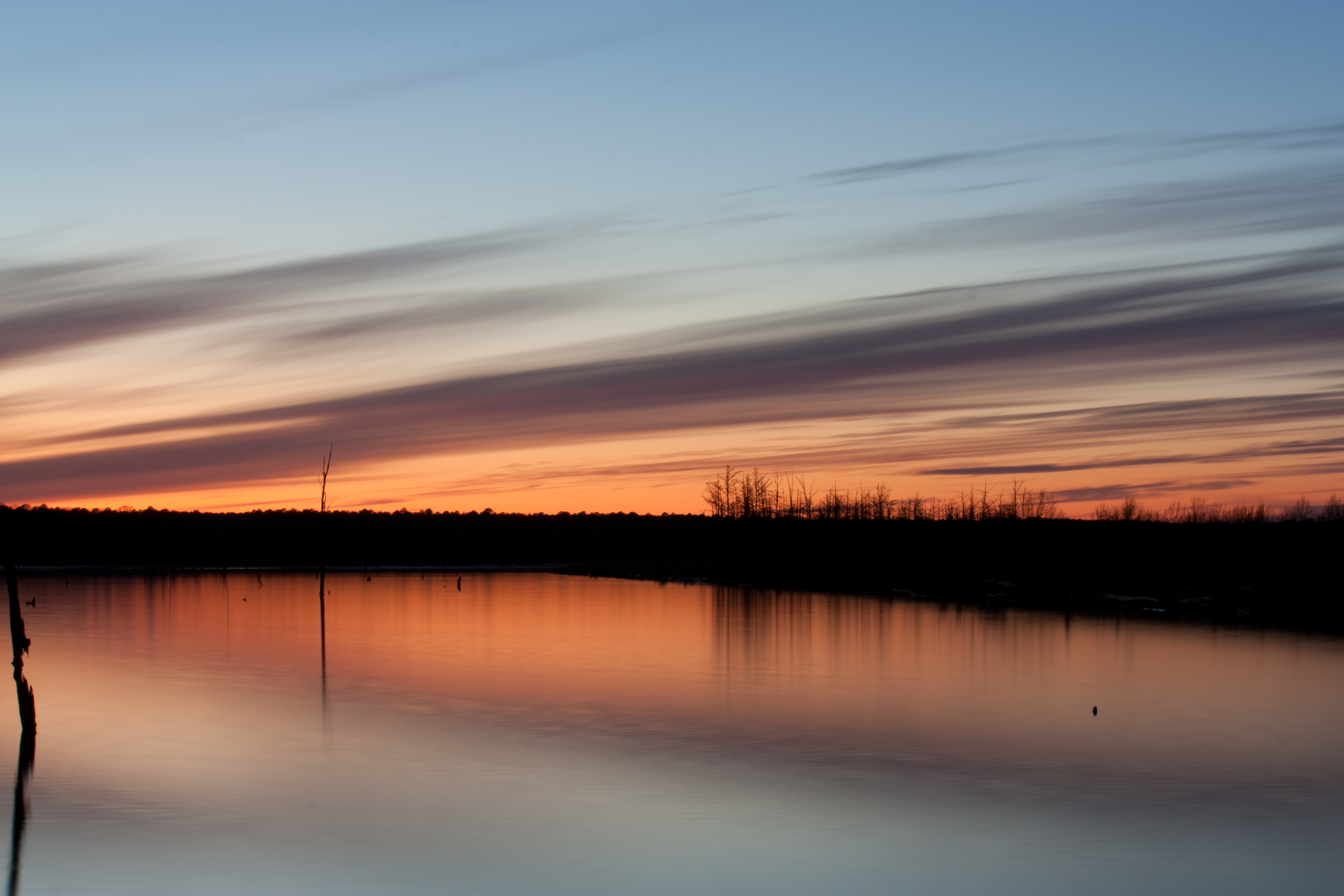

- Location within Arkansas Location within the United States
- Interactive map of Cane Creek State Park
- Location: Lincoln County, Arkansas, United States
- Coordinates: 33°54′47″N 91°45′53″W
- Area: 2,053 acres (831 ha)
- Established: May 18, 1992
- Administrator: Arkansas Department of Parks, Heritage and Tourism
- Website: Official website
- Arkansas State Parks

Cane Creek State Park is a 2,053-acre (831 ha) Arkansas state park in Lincoln County, Arkansas in the United States. Straddling the Gulf Coastal Plain and the Mississippi Delta, the park includes the 1,675-acre (678 ha) Cane Creek Lake, a wooded lake which borders Bayou Bartholomew, the world's longest bayou. The park became a reality when the U.S. Department of Agriculture’s Soil Conservation Service said it would provide federal funds to the project in 1973, prompting the Arkansas Game and Fish Commission (AGFC) to pledge to build and maintain the lake within the park. The park is characterized by rolling wooded hills, deep draws, and steeply sloping ridges.

== Recreation ==
Cane Creek State Park offers kayaking, fishing, mountain biking, backpacking, hiking, and geocaching. The Cane Creek Lake Trail is 15.5-mile (24.9 km) trail available for hiking or biking that offers hunting along the portion owned by the AGFC. The trail features several unique geological formations as a result of the Gulf Coast Plain meeting the Delta. The camping facilities include 29 class B campsites and one rent-a-RV. A climate-controlled pavilion and traditional pavilion as well as picnic tables are also available for use.

Visitors can rent kayaks and canoes for use on the lake, or spend time in the visitors' center, which contains exhibits and a gift shop.
