= Watershed and Flood Prevention Operations Program =

The Watershed and Flood Prevention Operations Program, a program of the Natural Resources Conservation Service (NRCS), includes Watershed Operations (under the Flood Control Act of 1944, P.L. 78- watershed projects to distinguish them from larger downstream projects built by the U.S. Army Corps of Engineers and by the Bureau of Reclamation.
