= List of Arkansas state parks =

Arkansas State Parks

There are 53 state parks in the U.S. state of Arkansas, as of 2025. The state parks division of the Arkansas Department of Parks, Heritage, and Tourism is the governing body and operator of all parks, although jurisdiction is shared with other state agencies in a few cases.

The first Arkansas state park, Petit Jean State Park, opened in 1923 following an unsuccessful attempt by a lumber company to donate the Seven Hollows and canyon areas to the federal government as a National Park. Stephen Mather deemed the parcel too small in 1921, but the Arkansas General Assembly passed Act 276, allowing the Commissioner of State Lands to accept donations of land for public use.

== Arkansas State Parks ==
The list gives an overview of Arkansas state parks and a brief history of their development since the first park opened in 1923. State parks range in size from 1 acre (0.40 ha) to 11,744 acres (4,753 ha).

Current Arkansas state parks
Name	County	Size	Estab- lished	River / lake	Image	Remarks
Arkansas Museum of Natural Resources	Union	19 acres (8 ha)	1986	None		Museum preserving and interpreting the history of oil and bromine mining in Arkansas
Arkansas Post Museum	Arkansas	8 acres (3.2 ha)	1997	None	Historic house sits beside a road	Museum dedicated to the history of Arkansas Post, Arkansas's territorial capital until 1821. Located on the grounds of the Arkansas Post National Memorial (National Park Service)
Blanchard Springs	Stone		2025	North Sylamore Creek	Historic house sits beside a road	
Bull Shoals-White River	Baxter, Marion	732 acres (296 ha)	1955	Bull Shoals Lake	A wide river passes between a steep tree-covered hillside and a rocky shoreline, with houses built into the trees and fishermen in a canoe	Trout fishing destination above and below Bull Shoals Dam with over 100 campsites
Cane Creek	Lincoln	2,053 acres (831 ha)	1992	Cane Creek Lake	An orange sunset reflects in a quiet and calm Cane Creek Lake with a timber line on the horizon	Wooded lake along Bayou Bartholomew including a hiking trail and camping
Conway Cemetery	Lafayette	11.5 acres (5 ha)	1986	None	A small fenced cemetery with large trees on a flat, green landscape	Historical state park with no recreational services located on James Sevier Conway's (the first governor of Arkansas) former cotton plantation
Cossatot River	Howard, Polk	5,230 acres (2145 ha)	1988	Cossatot River	Sharp rocks jut out from a river in a lush forest	Class III, IV, and V whitewater rafting river listed on the National Park Service's National Wild and Scenic Rivers System
Crater of Diamonds	Pike	911 acres (369 ha)	1972	Little Missouri River	Large tilled field among tall pine trees with several hopeful visitors digging for diamonds	World's only diamond-bearing site accessible to the public
Crowley's Ridge	Greene	291 acres (118 ha)	1937	Lake Ponder	A quiet Lake Ponder viewed through a grove of lush green trees and bushes	Park built on the homestead of Benjamin Crowley, dedicated to the culture and history of the Crowley's Ridge region. Includes many structures built in the 1930s by the Civilian Conservation Corps and spring-fed Lake Ponder
Daisy	Pike	276 acres (112 ha)	1955	Lake Greeson	Blue waters of Lake Greeson with the green Ouachita Mountains in the background under a blue sky full of white clouds	Park nestled within the Ouachita Mountains on Lake Greeson near the Ouachita National Forest. Popular for camping, water sports, and fishing
Davidsonville	Randolph	163 acres (66 ha)	1957	Black River	Quiet lake surrounded by tall, leafy green trees	Historic state park preserving the abandoned frontier river town of Davidsonville. Interpretive tours and signs guide visitors through the historic community bypassed by the Southwest Trail in the 1820s. Fishing is available along three nearby rivers, with 49 campsites
DeGray Lake	Clark, Hot Spring	984 acres (398 ha)	1974	DeGray Lake	Shining blue lake with trees in foreground	Resort state park with championship rated golf course, 94 room lodge, and over 100 campsites
Delta Heritage Trail	Arkansas, Desha, Phillips	960 acres (390 ha)	2002	Old Town Lake	Wooden footbridge ends and becomes a gravel trail with tall trees on either side	Rails to trails conversion of former railroad bed through Arkansas Delta lowlands, currently 14 miles (23 km), planned to be 73 miles (117 km)
Devil's Den	Washington	2,500 acres (1000 ha)	1933	Lee Creek	Red, green and orange fall foliage surrounds a small bridge spanning a quiet, rocky Lee Creek	Civilian Conservation Corps-built park in the Ozarks with lake, caves, swimming pool and several trails. Includes over 100 campsites, including cabins
Hampson Archeological Museum	Mississippi	5 acres (2 ha)	1961	None	Vessel resembling a human head on display at the museum	Museum displaying archeological artifacts from the Nodena site, an aboriginal village of the Nodena people dated 1400-1650 CE, and bones from the Island 35 Mastodon
Herman Davis	Mississippi	1 acre (0.4 ha)	1953	None	Granite statue of a young soldier in military uniform standing in front of an obelisk atop a plaque describing his achievements	Park surrounding a grave and memorial to Herman Davis, a U.S. sniper during World War I
Historic Washington	Hempstead	101 acres (41 ha)	1973	None	Original wood courthouse.	Fifty-three buildings that preserve and interpret the architectural, cultural, and political history of a historic nineteenth century town.
Hobbs Conservation Area	Benton, Carroll, Madison	12,056 acres (4879 ha)	1979	Beaver Lake	Stone bridge with five circular openings allowing a leaf-littered creek to pass through slowly	Large park in the Boston Mountains along Beaver Lake featuring trails, camping, and a shooting range.
Jacksonport	Jackson	164.7 acres (66.7 ha)	1965	Black River and White River	Large, ornate red brick courthouse sits on a green lawn with a gazebo in the foreground	Park containing the 1872 Jacksonport courthouse, preserving the culture and history of a former steamboat river town
Jenkins' Ferry Battleground	Grant	40 acres (16.2 ha)	1961	Saline River	Battle of Jenkins' Ferry Memorial	One of three battleground sites from the Camden Expedition of the Civil War. Water recreation available on the Saline River
Lake Catherine	Garland, Hot Spring	2,180 acres (882.2 ha)	1935	Lake Catherine	The blue waters of Lake Catherine with a tall pine tree-covered point jutting out into it and camp facilities visible on the shore in the background	Civilian Conservation Corps park created along the lake, resulting in a well-preserved natural shoreline. Park features cabins, campsites, nature programs, marina, hiking trails, and a sand beach swimming area
Lake Charles	Lawrence	140 acres (57 ha)	1967	Lake Charles		Lake is maintained and stocked with fish by the Arkansas Game and Fish Commission; also features camping, hiking, boat ramps and an interpretative nature center
Lake Chicot	Chicot	211.6 acres (85.6 ha)	1957	Lake Chicot, Arkansas	A bright blue lake with a line of cypress trees along the horizon and puffy white clouds in the equally blue sky	Largest oxbow lake in the United States; formerly the main channel of the Mississippi River. Park is located within a pecan grove within a bayou environment, offering 122 campsites, 14 cabins, swimming pool, boat shop/marina and interpretative visitor center.
Lake Dardanelle	Pope	246 acres (99.6 ha)	1966	Lake Dardanelle	A bright blue lake with a line of trees along the horizon, interrupted only by a cooling tower for the nuclear power plant in Russellville, and puffy white clouds in the blue sky	Two sites (Russellville and Dardanelle), including 74 campsites, boating, visitor center, and aquarium. Popular for bass fishing, including hosting many major tournaments.
Lake Fort Smith	Crawford	260 acres (105.2 ha)	1967	Lake Fort Smith	Shining blue water with the Ozark Mountains rising in the background	Large lake in the Ozarks offering 30 campsites, 10 cabins, a marina, swimming pool and visitor center
Lake Frierson	Greene	114 acres (46.1 ha)	1975	Lake Frierson	Quiet lake with a short wooded point jutting out from the right, with a dark green treeline along the horizon	Reservoir built along Crowley's Ridge known for fishing. Features seven campsites, trails, boat ramp and visitor center
Lake Ouachita	Garland	360 acres (145.7 ha)	1955	Lake Ouachita	Aerial view of a calm, shiny blue lake and matriculating around wooded peninsulas covered in green, orange and red foliage	Built surrounding a reservoir, the park features a marina, trails, restaurant, eagle tours, and interpretative information on three historic springs in the park vicinity
Lake Poinsett	Poinsett	132 acres (53.4 ha)	1963	Lake Poinsett	Calm lake surrounded by lush greenery	Popular with fishing enthusiasts, the park offers 29 campsites, trails and interpretative programs
Logoly	Columbia	368 acres (148.9 ha)	1974	Nature Pond	Small lake surrounded by old growth forest in winter	Environmental education park containing mature oak-hickory forests, mineral springs and endangered species
Louisiana Purchase	Lee, Monroe, Phillips	37.5 acres (15.2 ha)	1961	Cypress Swamp	Monument flooded swamp water surrounded by large, kneed cypress trees	Boardwalk through a headwater swamp leading to a monument dedicating the point of beginning of all surveys of the Louisiana Purchase, which allowed for the westward development and expansion of the United States
Lower White River Museum	Prairie	0.4 acres (0.2 ha)	1975	White River	A tan metal building with green trim with a carved wooden sign with the park's name	Museum dedicated to the preservation and interpretation of culture, commerce and history along the White River in Arkansas
Mammoth Spring	Fulton	623.5 acres (25 ha)	1957	Mammoth Spring		Park surrounding the large natural spring, offering fishing, boating and hiking, an Arkansas welcome center and museum
Marks' Mills Battleground	Cleveland	6.2 acres (2.5 ha)	1961	None		Park commemorating Civil War battle, including exhibits and park area. Also a Red River Campaign National Historic Landmark.
Millwood	Little River	824 acres (333 ha)	1976	Millwood Lake		Forested area surrounding large lake known for bass fishing, bird watching, hiking and camping.
Mississippi River	Lee, Phillips	536 acres (217 ha)	2009	Mississippi River		State park within the St. Francis National Forest. Park currently includes campground at Bear Creek Lake and birding trail.
Moro Bay	Bradley	117 acres (47 ha)	1972	Ouachita River		Park at the convergence of Raymond Lake, Moro Bay, and the Ouachita River with visitor center. Popular destination for fishing, water sports, hiking trails and camping.
Mount Magazine	Logan	2,234 acres (904 ha)	1983	None		The park contains Mossback Ridge, including the peak of Mount Magazine, Arkansas's highest point. Park also contains The Lodge at Mount Magazine, cabins, trails, and a hang gliding area.
Mount Nebo	Yell	2,984 acres (1208 ha)	1928	None	A flat, green, agricultural field with a rising Mount Nebo in the background.	One of three mountain state parks in the Arkansas River Valley, includes historic cabins, 14 miles (23 km) of hiking trails, and popular hang-gliding launch points.
Ozark Folk Center	Stone	637 acres (258 ha)	1973	None	A historic market with red roof with a wooden "Ozark Folk Center" sign.	Located near Mountain View, Arkansas, it preserves the music, culture, and traditions of the Ozark Mountains. Hosts special concerts and regular folk music performances.
Parkin Mounds	Cross	107 acres (43 ha)	1994	St. Francis River	The primary mound, a steep, grass covered rise on an otherwise flat plain	
Petit Jean	Conway	3,471 acres (1405 ha)	1923	Lake Bailey	View into a river valley from a rock outcropping, with green forest below and blue sky above	Situated atop Petit Jean Mountain in the Arkansas River Valley, offers trails, creeks, and geology throughout the forested mountains
Pinnacle Mountain	Pulaski	2,069 acres (837 ha)	1973	Maumelle River	Mountain rises from a flat floodplain	Rocky Pinnacle Mountain emerges where the flat Arkansas Delta intersects the Ouachita Mountains
Plantation Agriculture Museum	Lonoke	14.5 acres (5.9 ha)	1985	Horseshoe Lake	Two old buildings, the left an ornate brick façade in the Georgian style, the right a lean-to housing old, iron farm equipment	Former general store serving a community of cotton farmers operating as a museum including over 10,000 artifacts. Grounds also contain farm machinery used on cotton plantations.
Plum Bayou Mounds	Lonoke	185 acres (75 ha)	1975	Mound Pond	Two burial mounds rise above flat, green grass with a trees in the background.	
Poison Springs Battleground	Ouachita	85 acres (34 ha)	1961	None	Historic marker reading "Engagement at Poison Springs" in foreground of a forested area with rustic wooden pavilion in the background.	Preserves and commemorates the Battle of Poison Spring in the American Civil War, which was part of the 1864 Camden Expedition
Powhatan	Lawrence	9.1 acres (3.7 ha)	1970	Black River	An old, two-story brick courthouse with third-story bell tower under a starry night sky.	Preserves a small nineteenth-century river port town on the Black River
Prairie Grove Battlefield	Washington	840 acres (340 ha)	1957	None	Tall field stone column memorial flanked by United States and Confederate States of America flags surrounded by tall, leafy green trees.	Preserves and commemorates the Battle of Prairie Grove in the American Civil War. Park includes a museum, gift shop, and several historic structures from the period relocated to the site around a walking trail.
Queen Wilhelmina	Polk	460 acres (190 ha)	1957	None	Wooden two-story lodge with green roof, large field stone fireplace, double-decker porch facing a mountain vista.	Lodge atop Rich Mountain offers 38 guest rooms and is surrounded by forested slopes with creeks, trails, and mountain vistas. Located along the Talimena Scenic Drive.
South Arkansas Arboretum	Union	13 acres (5.3 ha)	1991	None		Arboretum and botanical garden owned by South Arkansas Community College with plants native to the Western Gulf Coastal Plain region.
Village Creek	Cross, St. Francis	6,909 acres (2,796 ha)	1972	Lakes Austell and Dunn	A dirt trail, a remnant of the Memphis to Little Rock Road, along a depression in the earth, with large trees on either side casting shadows on the path ahead.	Large park in the eastern part of the state. Rises along Crowley's Ridge from the surrounding Arkansas Delta, includes lakes, twenty-seven-hole golf course, camping, and hiking. One trail follows the 1820s Memphis to Little Rock Road.
White Oak Lake	Ouachita, Nevada	725 acres (293 ha)	1961	White Oak Lake	A skinny wooden trail continues ahead through a forest.	Lake in the woods on the border between Bottomland hardwood forest and loblolly pine forest with diverse wildlife. Camping, boating, fishing, and hiking are popular around the lake. Interpretative signs about the Red River Campaign in the area during the Civil War.
Withrow Springs	Madison	786 acres (318 ha)	1962	War Eagle Creek		
Woolly Hollow	Faulkner	370 acres (150 ha)	1973	Lake Bennett		

== Former parks ==
Former Arkansas state parks
Name	County	Size	Estab- lished	Decomm- issioned	River / lake	Supplanted by	Remarks
Buffalo River State Park	Marion	35 acres (14 ha)	1938	1973	Buffalo River	Buffalo National River	
Lost Valley State Park	Newton	280 acres (110 ha)	1966	1973	Buffalo River	Buffalo National River	Canyon, cave, hiking trail, and waterfall along Clark Creek, a tributary of the Buffalo River
Watson State Park	Jefferson	100 acres (40 ha)	1937	1944	Bayou Bartholomew	Private property	Donated by John Brown Watson for development as a state park for black people during segregation. Facilities were never developed and land was returned to his widow following court ruling the state had abandoned the park.

== Other Properties ==
Other properties operated by Arkansas State Parks
Name	County	Size	River / lake	Image	Remarks
Lake Sylvia Recreation Area	Perry	200 acres (81 ha)	Lake Sylvia		A former girl scout camp and a former National Forest Campground, this park encompasses an 18-acre lake and offers camping, hiking, swimming, and interoperative programs. Arkansas State Parks took management operations in July 2021 and is operated under Pinnacle Mountain State Park.
War Memorial Stadium	Pulaski	6.9 acres (2.8 ha)	None	Historic house sits beside a road	A multi-purpose stadium in Little Rock, Arkansas. Operated by Arkansas State Parks since 2017.

== See also ==
- List of U.S. national parks
- List of Wildlife Management Areas in Arkansas
