= Cossatot River State Park-Natural Area =

State park in Arkansas, United States

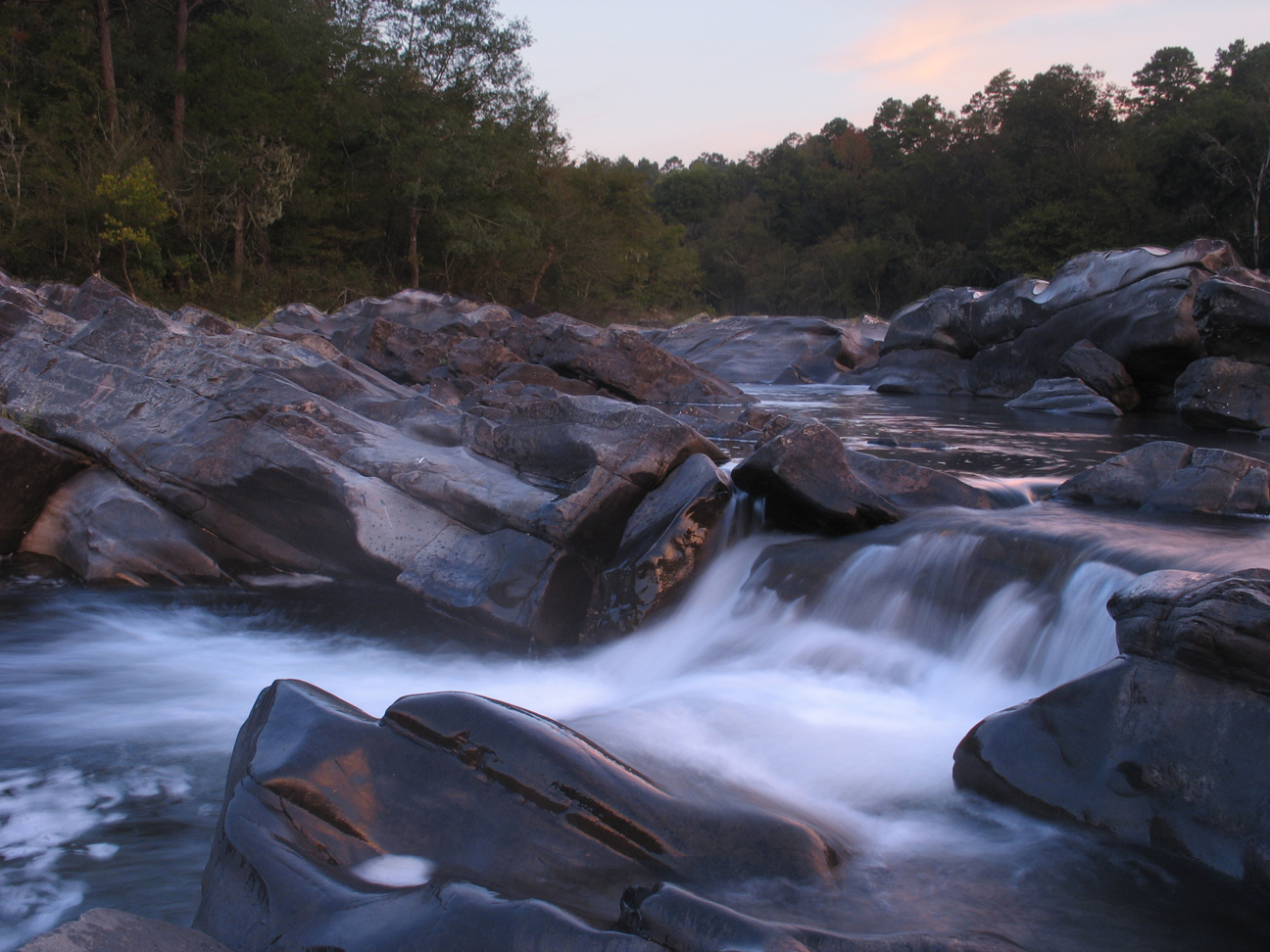
- Cossatot River

- Location within Arkansas Location within the United States
- Interactive map of Cossatot River State Park-Natural Area
- Location: Polk and Howard counties, Arkansas, United States
- Coordinates: 34°17′39″N 94°10′39″W
- Area: 5,300 acres (2,100 ha)
- Established: February 19, 1988
- Administrator: Arkansas Department of Parks, Heritage and Tourism, Arkansas Natural Heritage Commission
- Website: Official website
- Arkansas State Parks

Cossatot River State Park-Natural Area is a 5,299.65-acre (2,144.69 ha) Arkansas state park in Howard County and Polk County, Arkansas in the United States. The park follows a rough, undeveloped 12.5 miles (20.1 km) of the Cossatot River. The river itself is included in Arkansas's Natural and Scenic Rivers System and the National Park Service's list of National Wild and Scenic Rivers, making it a whitewater rafting destination. The rough nature of the river, including Class III, IV, and dangerous Class V rapids, make the park-natural area a popular destination for skilled canoeists, kayakers, and playboaters. The park became a part of the system in 1988 after the Arkansas Department of Parks and Tourism and Arkansas Natural Heritage Commission agreed to cooperative management after acquiring the property from the Weyerhaeuser Corporation.

== History ==
The Arkansas Natural Heritage Commission contacted the Weyerhaeuser Corporation, the land's owner, about developing a park from the wilderness along the Cossatot River in 1975. Although receptive of the offer, Weyerhaeuser was concerned that the commission would not properly manage the dangerous rapids. It wasn't until 1984 when the Arkansas Department of Parks and Tourism offered to join the Commission in a joint venture to acquire the land in an attempt to allay the fears of Weyerhaeuser. After a joint meeting, The Nature Conservancy held the land in trust until state funds were allocated for the park. The duality of the park-natural area's management is still represented.

The park was expanded after Arkla Gas Company donated 160 acres (65 ha) in exchange for crossing the Cossatot River with a 36 inches (910 mm) gas pipeline.

== Recreation ==
The Cossatot River features Class III, IV, and dangerous Class V rapids making it one of the more challenging float rivers in the central United States. Brushy Creek Recreation Area offers restrooms, picnic tables, and access to the river via the Highway 246 bridge access point. Campsites are available at the Cossatot Falls Area (7 sites, no hookups), Sandbar Area (14 sites, no hookups), and the Ed Banks Area (one site, no hookups).

The park is also home to dozens of rare flora and fauna native only to the Ouachita Mountains and surrounding Ouachita National Forest. The terrain of the park is a rugged rocky canyon with old growth hardwoods and juniper glades. Hiking is available on the River Corridor Trail (14 miles (23 km)) and Harris Creek Trail (3.5 miles (5.6 km)). A visitor center, built in 2004, offers a wildlife observation room, a water education laboratory, and a gift shop.
