= Poison Springs State Forest =

State forest in Arkansas, U.S.

- IUCN category IV (habitat/species management area)
- Location within Arkansas
- Location: Camden, Arkansas, United States
- Coordinates: 33.6312233°N 93.0268325°W
- Area: 23,506 acres (95.13 km^{2})
- Elevation: 289 ft (88 m)
- Established: 1957
- Named for: Poison Spring
- Governing body: Arkansas Forestry Commission

The Poison Springs State Forest encompasses 23,506 acres (9,513 ha) in Ouachita and Nevada counties in the U.S. state of Arkansas, and is under the authority of the Arkansas Forestry Commission (AFC). The name derives from the 1864 Battle of Poison Spring, so-called because of a legend about the poisoning of local water at the time of the battle. The actual battle site is preserved as Poison Springs Battleground State Park, located on 85 acres (34 ha) inside the forest.

Within the forest are numerous campsites, with more than 350 annual permits issued. The Arkansas Game and Fish Commission (AGFC) oversees hunting and fishing on 22,162 acres (8,969 ha) of the forest that it designated a Wildlife Management Area in 1972, qualifying it for Protected Area status. Within that area, management is split between two state agencies. The AGFC oversees the management of the Poison Springs State Forest Sand Barren portion, while the Arkansas Natural Heritage Commission (ANHC) oversees management of the Arkansas Oak Natural Area and the Oak-Pine Forest Preserve Natural Area.
