= Lake Frierson State Park =

State park in Arkansas, United States

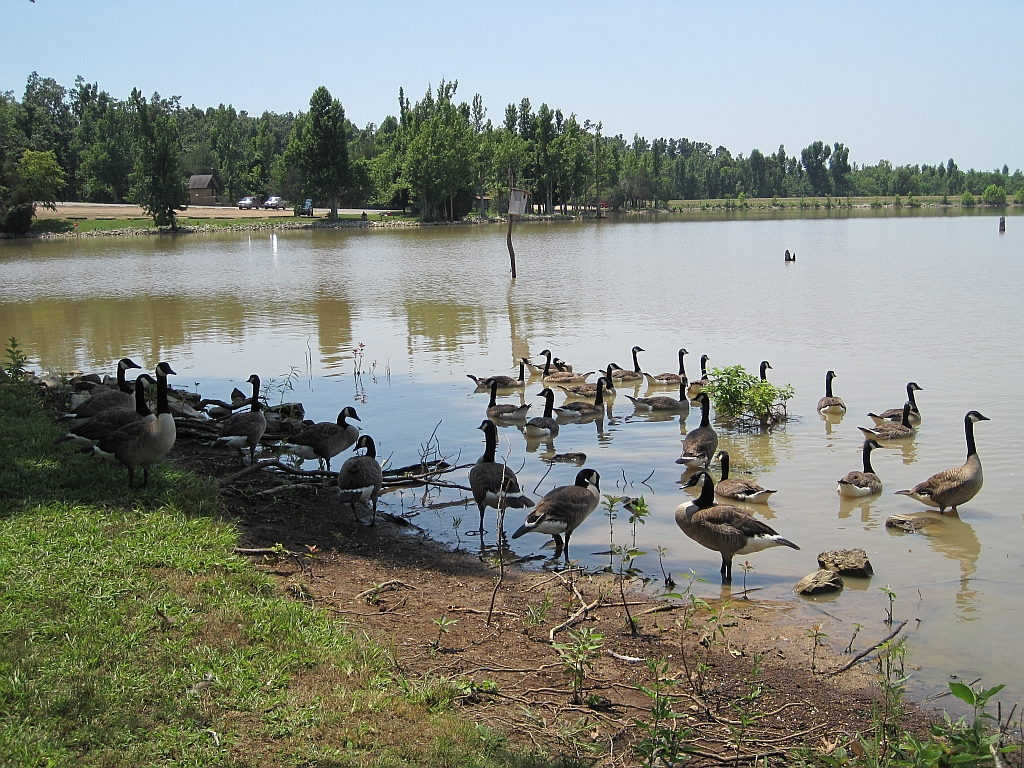

- Location within Arkansas Location within the United States
- Interactive map of Lake Frierson State Park
- Location: Greene County, Arkansas, United States
- Coordinates: 35°58′21″N 90°42′58″W
- Area: 114 acres (46 ha)
- Established: 1975
- Administrator: Park: Arkansas Department of Parks and Tourism; Lake: Arkansas Game and Fish Commission
- Website: Official website
- Arkansas State Parks

Lake Frierson State Park is a 114-acre (46 ha) Arkansas state park on Crowley's Ridge in Greene County, eastern Arkansas.

Containing a 335 acres (136 ha) reservoir built by the Soil Conservation Service, the park entered the system in 1975. The park skirts the Crowley's Ridge formation and offers fishing as well as hiking, camping, kayaking, and a visitor center.

In addition to the recreation opportunities at Lake Frierson, the area is home to a unique blend of forests in the state. Located partially in a forest similar to those found in the Appalachians, the park also contains the oak-hickory forest native to the Ozarks and a wide variety of rare trees in Arkansas on Crowley's Ridge's northern slopes, including the cucumber tree, northern red oak and tulip tree.

== History ==
In the 1970s, the Soil Conservation Service (now known as Natural Resources Conservation Service or NRCS) constructed ten dams along the western edge of Crowley's Ridge in northeast Arkansas. The ridge is a geological formation that rises 150–250 feet (46–76 m) above the surrounding flat Arkansas Delta. Charles Frierson, a lawyer and judge from Jonesboro, was instrumental in acquiring the property as a state park. The site officially became a state park when funding was approved by the Arkansas General Assembly in 1975. Although initially only a day-use park, Lake Frierson has grown to a full service park with visitor center and camping facilities.

== Recreation ==
Camping is available in four class C and three class D campsites on the east side of the lake. Picnic areas are scattered throughout the park, and an air-conditioned and heated pavilion with room for 80 attendees is available for rent. Fishing for bream, catfish, crappie, and bass is available in the timber-filled Lake Frierson. Non-motor fishing boats and pedal boats are available for rent, and bait, fishing and camping supplies and gifts can be purchased at the visitor center. Visitors are also able to hike along the circular 1/2-mile (0.80 km) Dogwood Lane Trail, a self-guided interpretative trail.
