= Arkansas Department of Parks, Heritage, and Tourism =

Government agency of the U.S. state of Arkansas

- Seal

Department overview
- Formed: July 1, 2019
- Preceding agencies: Department of Arkansas Heritage; Department of Parks and Tourism
- Jurisdiction: Government of Arkansas
- Headquarters: 1 Capitol Mall, Little Rock, Arkansas; 34°44′48.6″N 92°17′26.8″W
- Department executive: Shea Lewis, Secretary of Parks, Heritage, and Tourism
- Child Department: Division of Arkansas Heritage, others
- Website: arkansas.com

The Arkansas Department of Parks, Heritage, and Tourism (ADPHT) is a cabinet level agency in the executive branch of Arkansas state government responsible for promoting, protecting, interpreting, and managing the state's natural and cultural resources. The department was established on July 1, 2019.

== See also ==
- Arkansas Constitutional Amendment 75
- List of Arkansas state parks
- Division of Arkansas Heritage
