= Nodena phase =

Archaeological phenomenon in Arkansas and Mississippi, United States

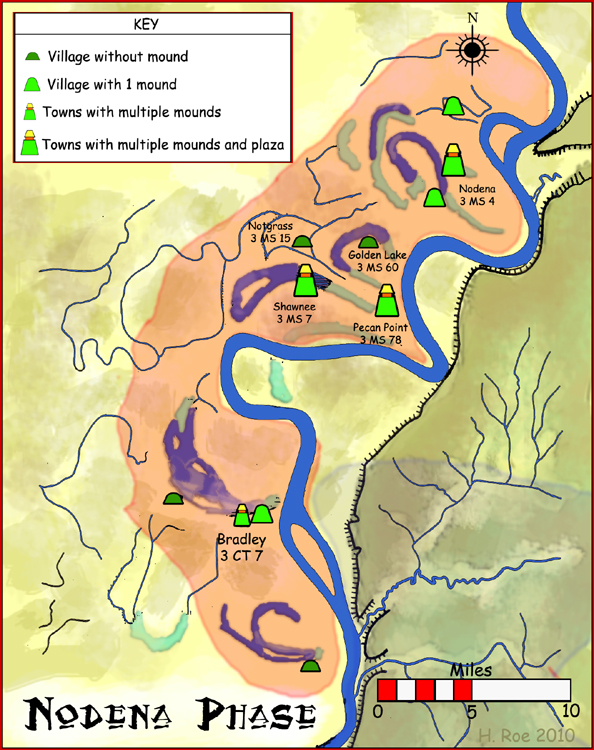
The Nodena phase and some of its associated sites

The Nodena phase is an archaeological phase in eastern Arkansas and southeastern Missouri of the Late Mississippian culture which dates from about 1400–1650 CE. The Nodena phase is known from a collection of villages along the Mississippi River between the Missouri Bootheel and Wapanocca Lake. They practiced extensive maize agriculture and artificial cranial deformation and were members of a continent wide trade and religious network known as the Southeastern Ceremonial Complex, which brought chert, whelk shells, and other exotic goods to the area.

The Spanish Hernando de Soto Expedition is believed to have visited several sites in the Nodena phase in the early 1540s, which is usually identified as the Province of Pacaha.

== Settlement pattern ==
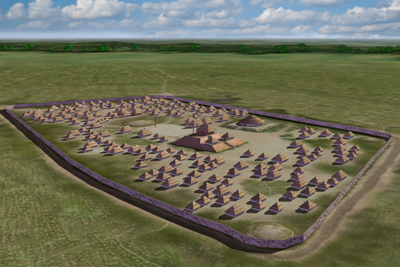
Artists conception of the Nodena site ca. 1539, by Herb Roe

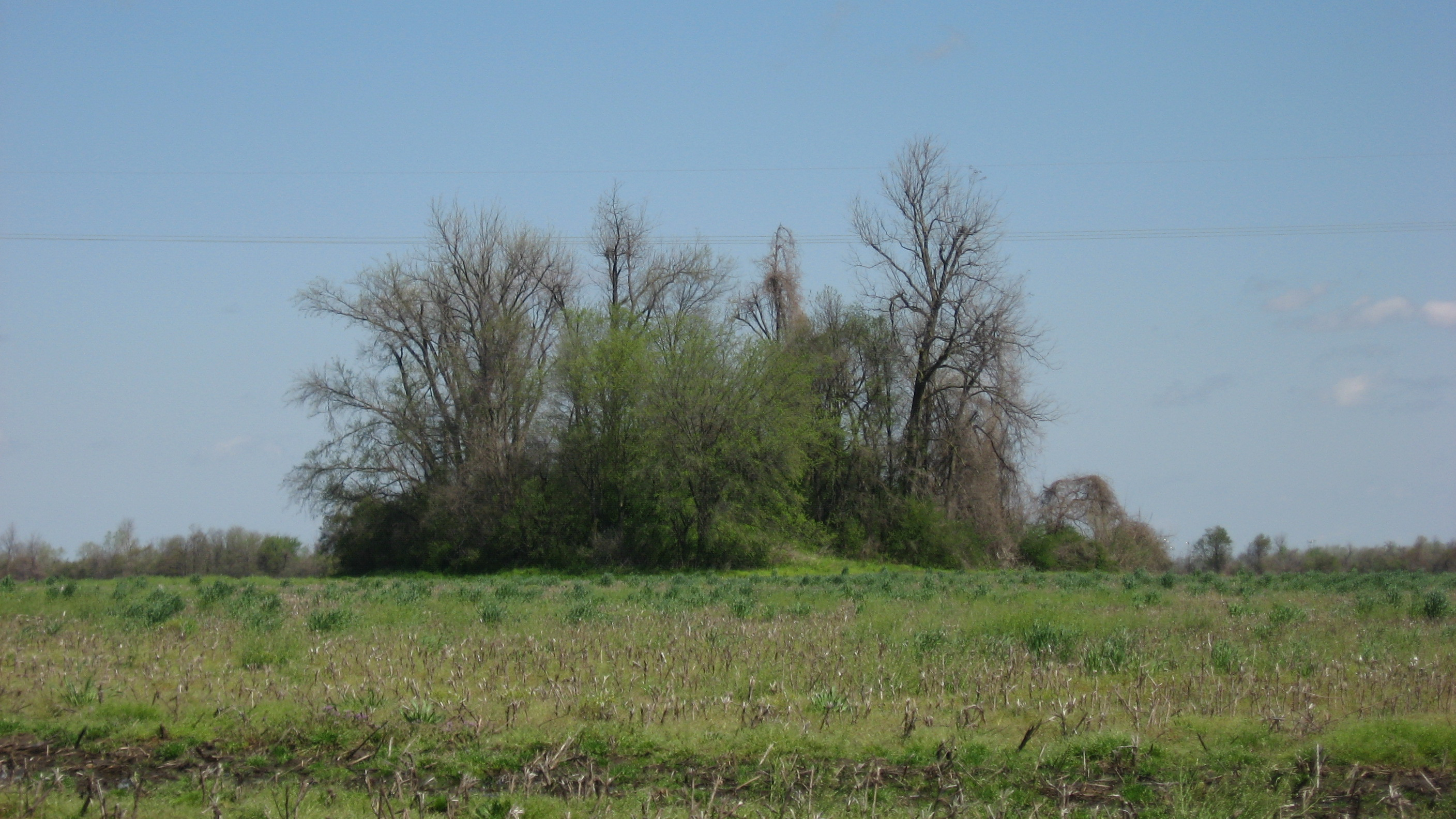
Chickasawba Mound

Nodena phase sites are found in three geographic subdistricts: the Wilson-Joiner, the Wapanocca Lake, and the Blytheville subdistricts.

=== Wilson-Joiner subdistrict ===
- Nodena site - The Nodena site is the type site for the Nodena phase, located east of Wilson, Arkansas in Mississippi County on a meander bend of the Mississippi River. The Nodena site was discovered and first documented by Dr. James K. Hampson, archaeologist and owner of the plantation on which the site is located. Artifacts from this site are on display in the Hampson Museum State Park in Wilson.
- Pecan Point site (3 Ms 78) - excavated by Clarence B. Moore in 1910 or 1911

=== Wapanocca Lake subdistrict ===
The largest site in the Wapanocca Lake district is the Bradley site (3 Ct 7). The Bradley Site and its nearby cluster of towns and villages (3 Ct 9, 3 Ct 43, 3 Ct 14, 3 Ct 17, Banks site) are considered good candidates for the Pacaha capital and the other nearby villages visited by the de Soto expedition.

=== Blytheville subdistrict ===
- Campbell Archeological Site (23 Pm 5) - The site is in southeastern Missouri and was occupied from 1350 to 1541 CE. It features a large mound and village, as well as a cemetery area. The site was excavated by amateur archaeologist Leo O. Anderson and Professor Carl Chapman from 1954 to 1968, they published the first material on the site in 1955. The site has yielded the largest number of Spanish artifacts of any prehistoric site in Southeastern Missouri. Finds at the site included glass chevron beads, a Clarksdale bell, iron knife fragments and part of a brass book binder.
- Chickasawba Mound (3 M 55) - also known as the Blytheville Mound, Chickasaw Mound, Gosnell Place and the Big Mound. Added to the National Register of Historic Places in 1984.
- Eaker site (3 Ms 105) - A site on Eaker Air Force Base near Blytheville, Arkansas that is the largest and most intact Late Mississippian Nodena phase village site within the Central Mississippi Valley. It also shows evidence of later Quapaw occupation. Like many Mississippian settlements, it is located on the bank of a river, the Pemiscot Bayou in the St. Francis Basin. The Eaker site is large but has no known mound, although it is rumored to have once had one.

== Culture ==
=== Pottery ===
Most pottery found at the Nodena sites is of the Mississippian Bell Plain variety. It was buff colored, contains large fragments of ground mussel shell as a tempering agent, and is not as smooth and polished as other varieties. Other examples found there are much finer, with a finer ground shell as a temper, some instances being so finely ground as to look untempered. Shapes and decoration were varied in the mortuary pottery, from brightly colored abstract spiral designs, to elaborate effigy vessels depicting human heads, animals, and hunters and their prey. Pottery made by the Nodena people was built up from strips of clay, and then smoothed out by the potter, much like other pottery in the Eastern America area where the potters wheel was unknown. Slips using galena for white, hematite for red, and sometimes graphite for black were used to paint the pottery, with a red on white swastika design being particularly popular. Sometimes incising was used (an example is the incised raptor image on the effigy head pot pictured), although it is rare in Nodena pottery. Women were probably the makers of pottery, as in most other Native American cultures. The grave of a woman at the Nodena site contained 11 polishing pebbles and a mushroom shaped pottery anvil.

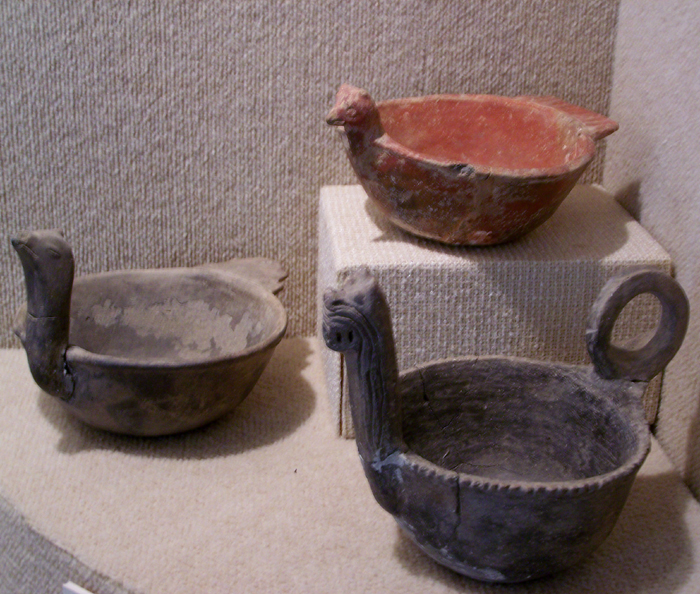

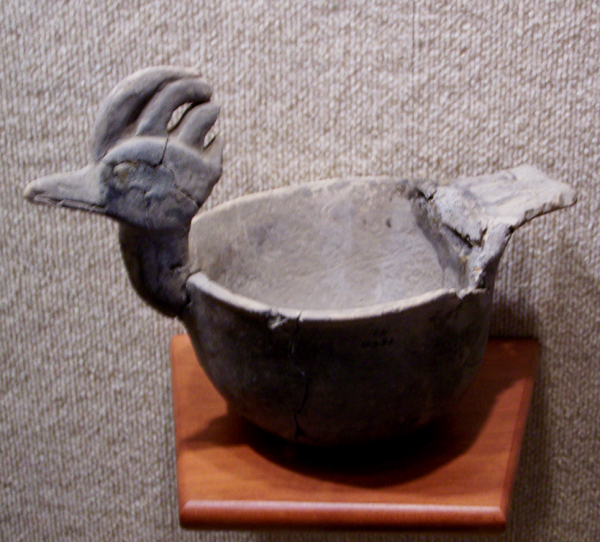

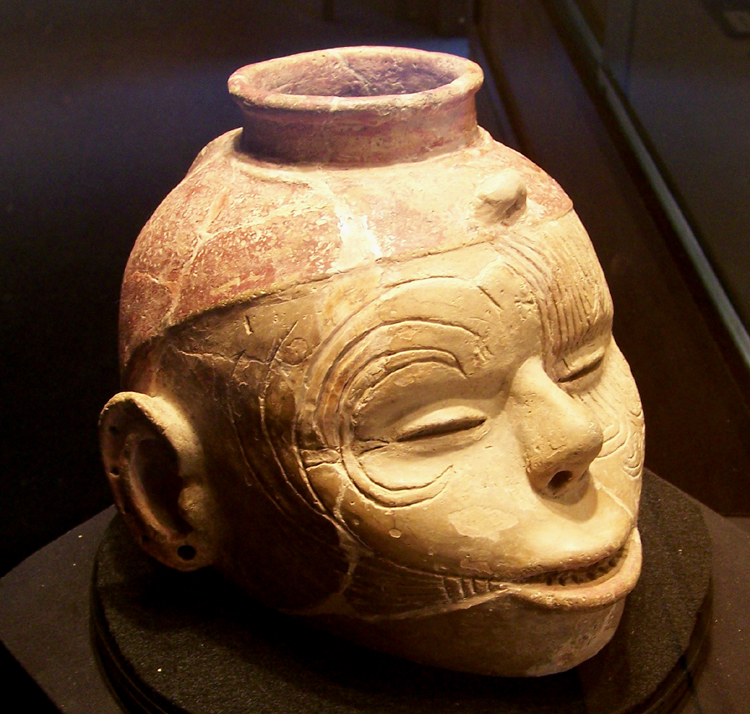

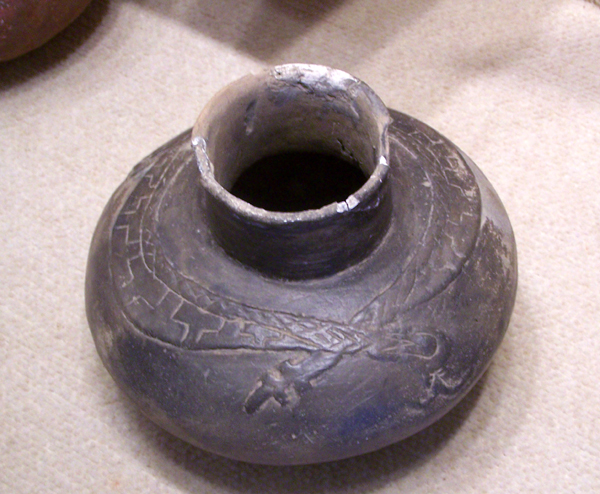

=== Lithic industry ===
Nodena phase peoples traded with other groups to the west and northwest in the Crowley's Ridge and Ozark Highlands areas for usable stone to make tools. Because of the conditions of the floodplain geography where they lived, no stone was available locally. Chert, basalt, and sandstone were turned into a variety of tools such as celts, chisels, adzes, abraders, hammerstones, hoes, drillbits, mortar and pestles, spear points, and arrow heads. A popular arrow head style is known as the Nodena point, a delicate leaf like shape. Sandstone was also ground and polished into a discoidal shape for use in the game of chunkey.

Nodena points are an exquisitely made willow leaf-shaped flint blades named for the Nodena site that are diagnostic of the Late Mississippian and Protohistoric periods over a large section of the American Midwest and South. Examples have been found in Dallas phase sites in Tennessee, Oneota sites in Iowa and Wisconsin, Caborn-Welborn culture sites in Indiana, Illinois, and Kentucky, protohistoric Quapaw sites in Arkansas, as well as sites in Alabama, and Florida. Two different types of Nodena points were made, the Nodena Elliptical and the Nodena Banks varieties. The Banks variety has a straight base, as opposed to the bi-point shape of the Nodena Elliptical. The Banks variety is named for the Banks site, near Wapanocca Lake (see illustration for distribution and diagram of types).

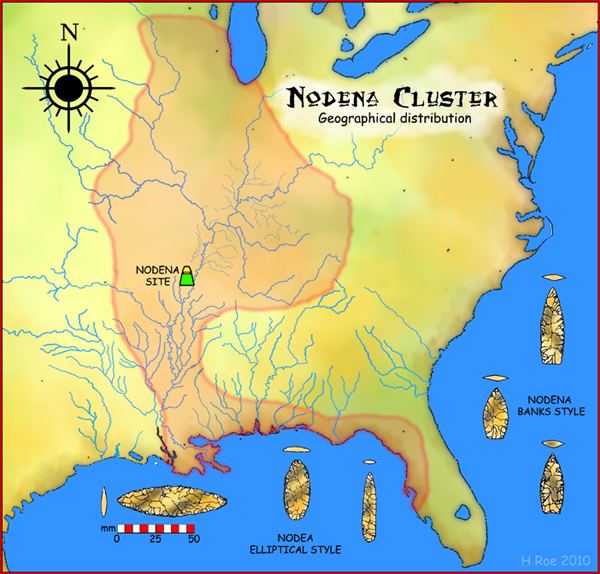

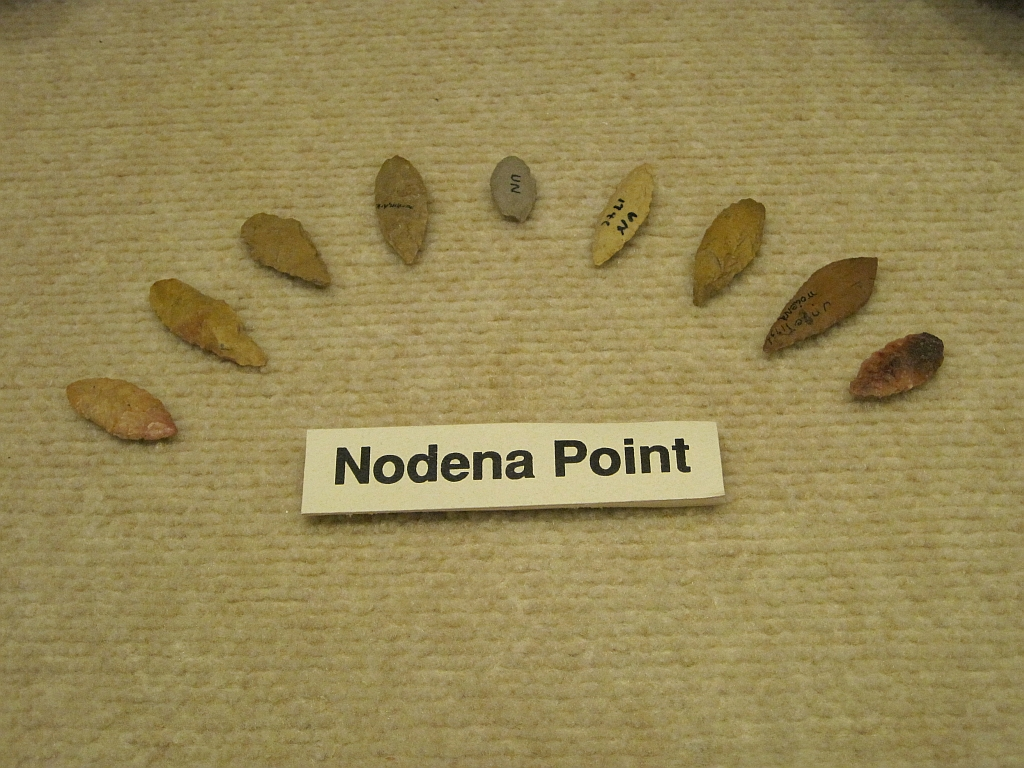

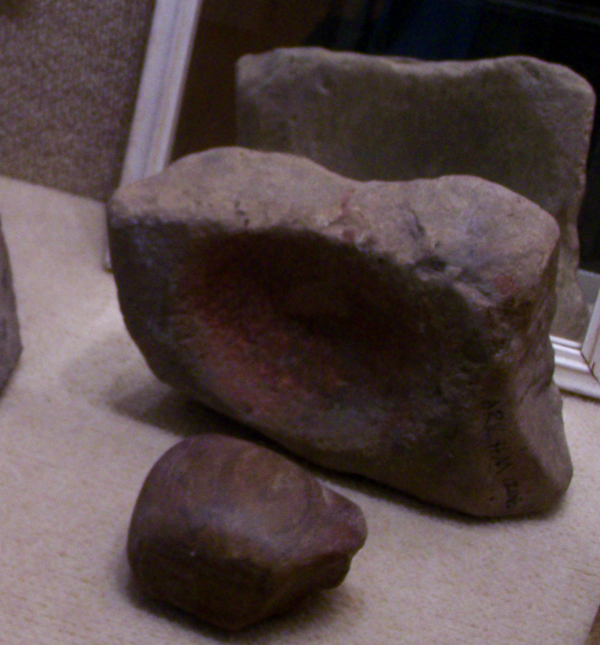

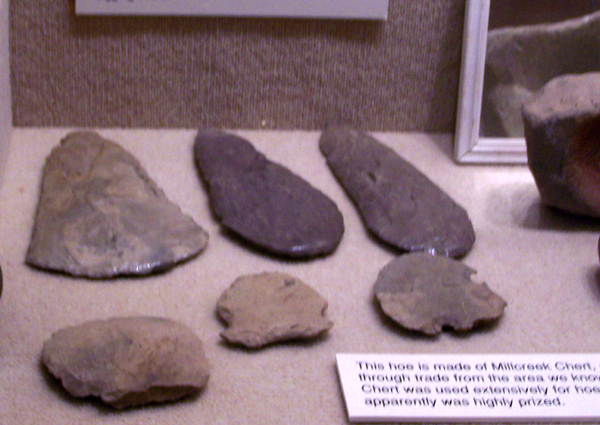

=== Agriculture and food ===
The people of Nodena were intensely involved in maize agriculture, as well as other food crops originating in the Americas, such as beans, squash, sunflowers and gourds. They also gathered wild foodstuffs such as pecans and persimmons. The de Soto chroniclers described the area as being under heavy cultivation, and the most populous they had seen in La Florida. The Spaniards described groves of wild fruit and nut bearing trees, implying that the Nodena must have left them standing when clearing other trees for the cultivation of maize. The hunting of whitetail deer, squirrel, rabbit, turkey, and mallard was practiced as well as fishing for alligator gar, catfish, drum, and mussels.

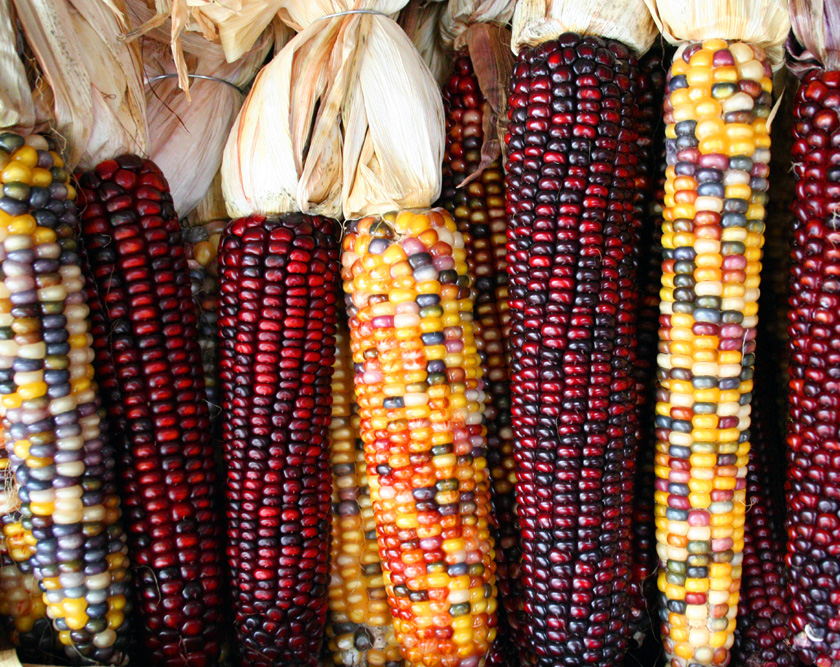

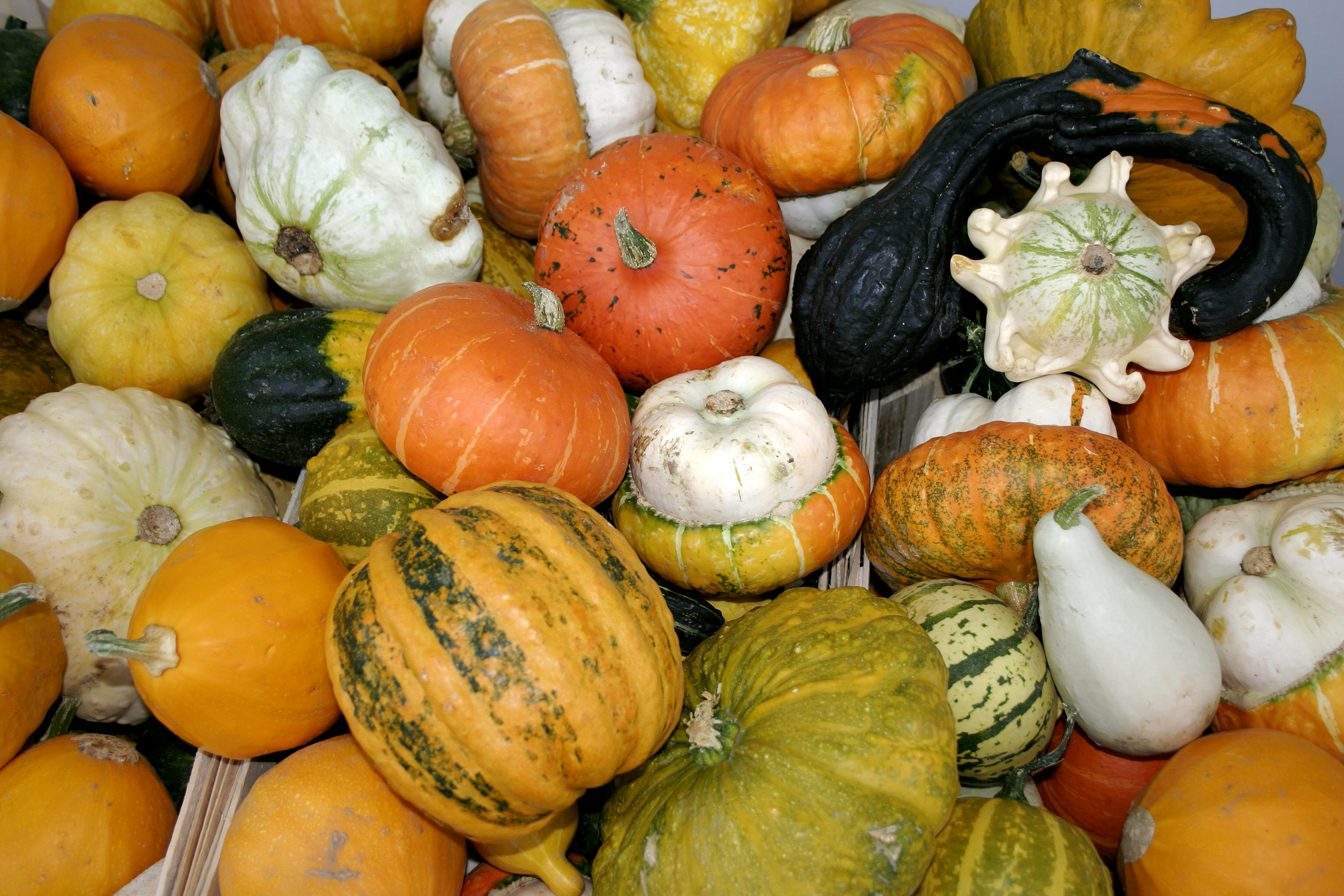

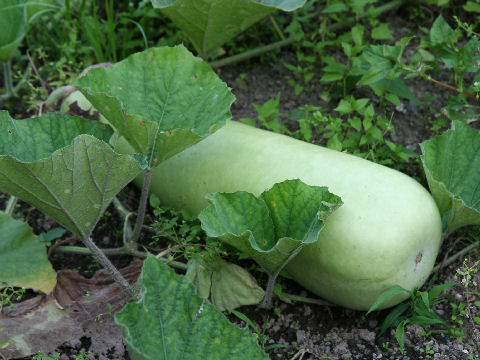

=== Head deformation ===
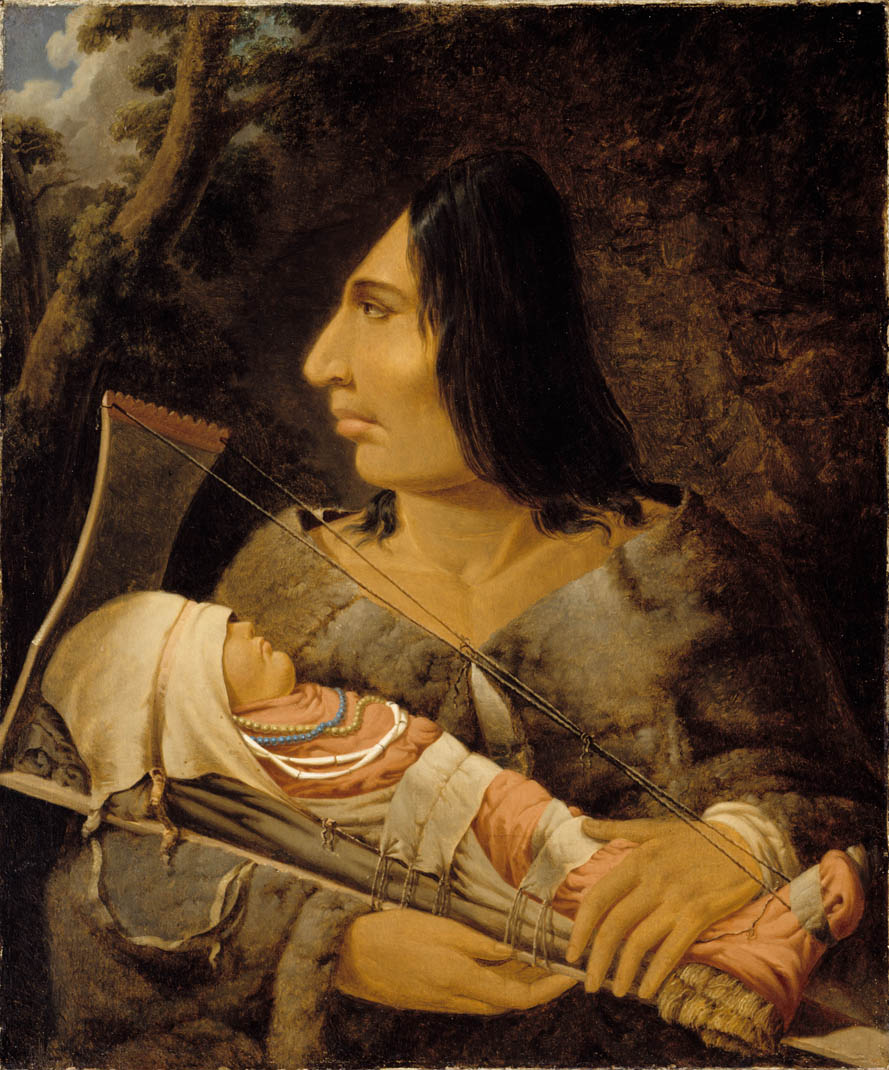
Painting by artist Paul Kane showing a Chinookans woman with a deformed skull and an infant in a cradle designed to deform the skull

The people of the Nodena phase practiced artificial cranial deformation or head flattening. Shortly after infants were born, they were strapped to a special carrier which deformed their skulls as they grew. Many of the skeletal remains found at the Nodena site had deformed skulls, of the type defined as fronto-occipital deformation, flattening of the forehead and the back of the head. Of 123 skulls found by Dr. Hampson, only six could be considered "normal", meaning they did not show the signs of head deformation. The functioning of the brain is not affected by cranial deformation, but the overall shape of the skull bones is. This practice was performed by many Native American tribes into historic times, including the Choctaw, although it later fell out of favor.

=== Burial customs ===
Family cemeteries with burials occurring in groups of 15 to 20 or more were found at some Nodena phase sites. Burials were in the extended position, lying on their backs, with most oriented on a north–south axis. The Nodena phase people also left grave offerings for the afterlife with their deceased. Graves included a bowl and a bottle near the heads of the deceased, usually of the finer variety of effigy pottery. Sometimes tools were also included, as one woman's grave contained pottery making implements.

=== Language ===
The peoples of Nodena were probably Tunican or Siouan speaking. It is known that the Tunica were in the area at the time of the de Soto Entrada, and the related group of phases present in the region may have all been Tunican speakers, with Caddoan speakers to their west and south. But by the time of later European contact in the 1670s and the beginning of the historic period, the area was occupied by the Dhegiha Siouan speaking Quapaw. Attempts have been made to connect pottery styles and words from the de Soto narratives with historic tribes, but have so far been unsuccessful.

== Relationship with neighboring peoples ==
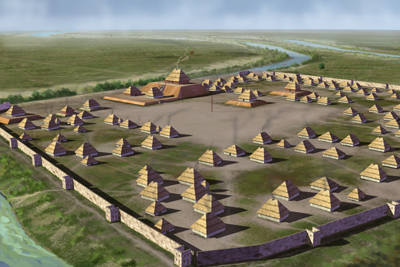
Capital of the Casqui Province, illustration by H. Roe

Other contemporaneous groups in the area include the Parkin phase, Tipton phase, Menard phase, Belle Meade phase and Walls phase. The archaeological and ethnohistorical records suggest that the groups were rival or politically allied polities, with no neutral parties, engaged in internecine conquest warfare. The presence of palisades, earthen embankments and moats and the absence of isolated single-family dwellings and smaller hamlets among the local phases suggests such a state of endemic warfare existed. According to the de Soto narratives, Pacaha had been at war for some time with a neighboring group, the Casqui. The Casqui are thought to have had their principal town at a site near Parkin at the location of the present-day Parkin Archeological State Park. Differences in pottery manufacture and burial customs found by archaeologists suggest the two groups had been isolated from each other for quite some time. The narratives record that the Pacaha and Casqui claimed they had been at war for many generations. The many years of fighting had led to a stalemate, where neither group was able to get the upper hand. Attacks were only carried out when the aggressor felt confident of success. The Pacaha controlled more territory and had a larger population than the Casqui. Chief Pacaha was younger than the Casqui chief, however, and seemingly had more to lose from the continued aggressive Casqui attacks.

Other groups mentioned in the narratives were clearly vassal states of the Pacaha polity. Two such groups were the Aquixo and the Quizquiz, now identified as the Belle Meade and Walls phase peoples.

== Effects of European contact ==
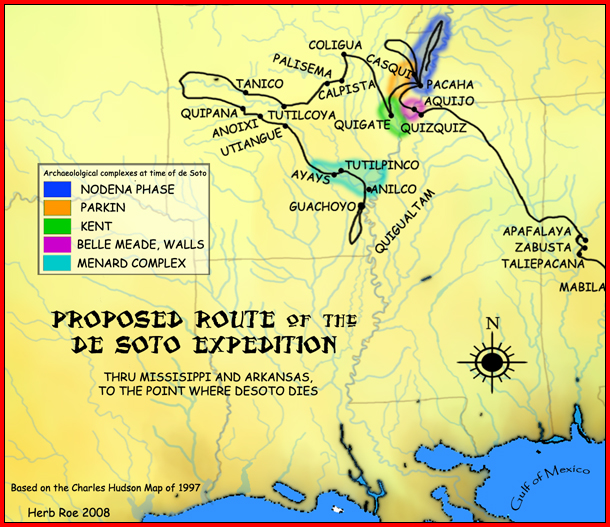
A map showing the de Soto expedition route through Mississippi, and Arkansas, up to the point de Soto died, based on the Charles M. Hudson map of 1997

De Soto encountered the Casqui tribe first. When he pressed on to visit the Pacaha, many of the Casqui people followed him. Many of the Pacaha, seeing the approach of their enemy, fled to a fortified island in the river, with many drowning in the attempt. The Casqui who had followed de Soto proceeded to sack the village, desecrate the temple and the remains of the Pacaha honored dead, and steal everything they could. Approximately one hundred and fifty Pacaha warriors were decapitated and their heads placed on poles outside the temple, replacing the heads of Casqui warriors.

De Soto contacted Chief Pacaha and convinced him that he had nothing to do with the attack and that the expedition's intentions were peaceful. De Soto even assured the Pacaha that the expedition would help the Pacaha attack the Casqui to punish them for their subterfuge. The Casqui received advance warning of the planned attack and decided to return the looted items and issue an apology in order to stave off retribution from the combined Spanish and Pacaha force. De Soto arranged a dinner for the two leaders and arranged a peace treaty between the two groups. As a gesture of gratitude for the arrangement of peace and also to outdo his rival, who had only presented a daughter to de Soto, Chief Pacaha presented de Soto with one of his wives, one of his sisters, and another woman from his tribe. The de Soto expedition stayed at Pacaha's village for approximately 40 days.

The Hernando de Soto expedition records are the only historical records of Chief Pacaha and his people. Their later history remains uncertain. By the time of the next documented European presence in the area in 1673 by the Marquette and Jolliet expedition, the region was populated sparsely by the Quapaw. The introduction of European diseases such as smallpox and measles and the upsetting of the local balance of power by the Spaniards is thought to have contributed to the depopulation of the region described by the de Soto expedition as the most populous they had seen in La Florida.

In Aquixo, and Casqui, and Pacaha, they saw the best villages seen up to that time, better stockaded and fortified, and the people were of finer quality, excepting those of Cofitachequi.

— RODRIGO RANJEL 1547–49

Attempts have been made to link the Nodena people to historic groups by analyzing words recorded in the de Soto narratives and pottery from archaeological sites. Because of their presence in the area, the Quapaw were long considered a viable candidate. More recent analysis has focused on the Tunica people, who were living in the Lower Yazoo River valley by the late 17th century.

== See also ==
- History of the Tunica people
- Mississippian culture
- Southeastern Ceremonial Complex
- List of Mississippian sites
- List of sites and peoples visited by the Hernando de Soto Expedition
