= Island 35 Mastodon =

Fossil

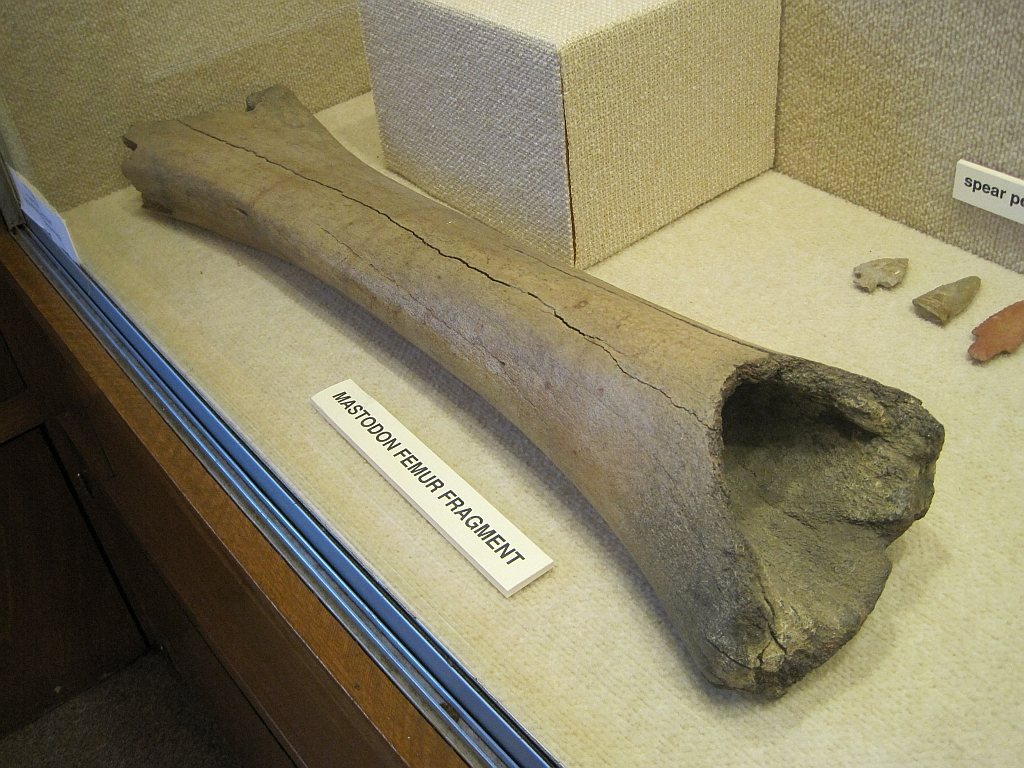
- Femur fragment of the Island 35 Mastodon at Hampson Museum State Park
- Common name: Island 35 Mastodon
- Species: Mastodon, species uncertain
- Age: 2 million years
- Place discovered: Tennessee, United States
- Date discovered: 1900
- Discovered by: John Pendleton

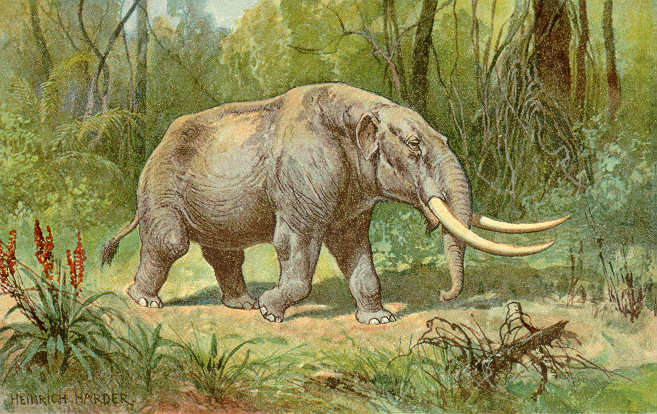
Mastodons roamed North America until c. 8000 BC (painting by Heinrich Harder, c. 1920)

The Island 35 Mastodon was discovered on Island No. 35 of the Mississippi River in the United States.

The Pleistocene-era mastodon skeleton was excavated in 1900 near the town of Reverie, Tennessee. In 1957, the site was reported as destroyed.

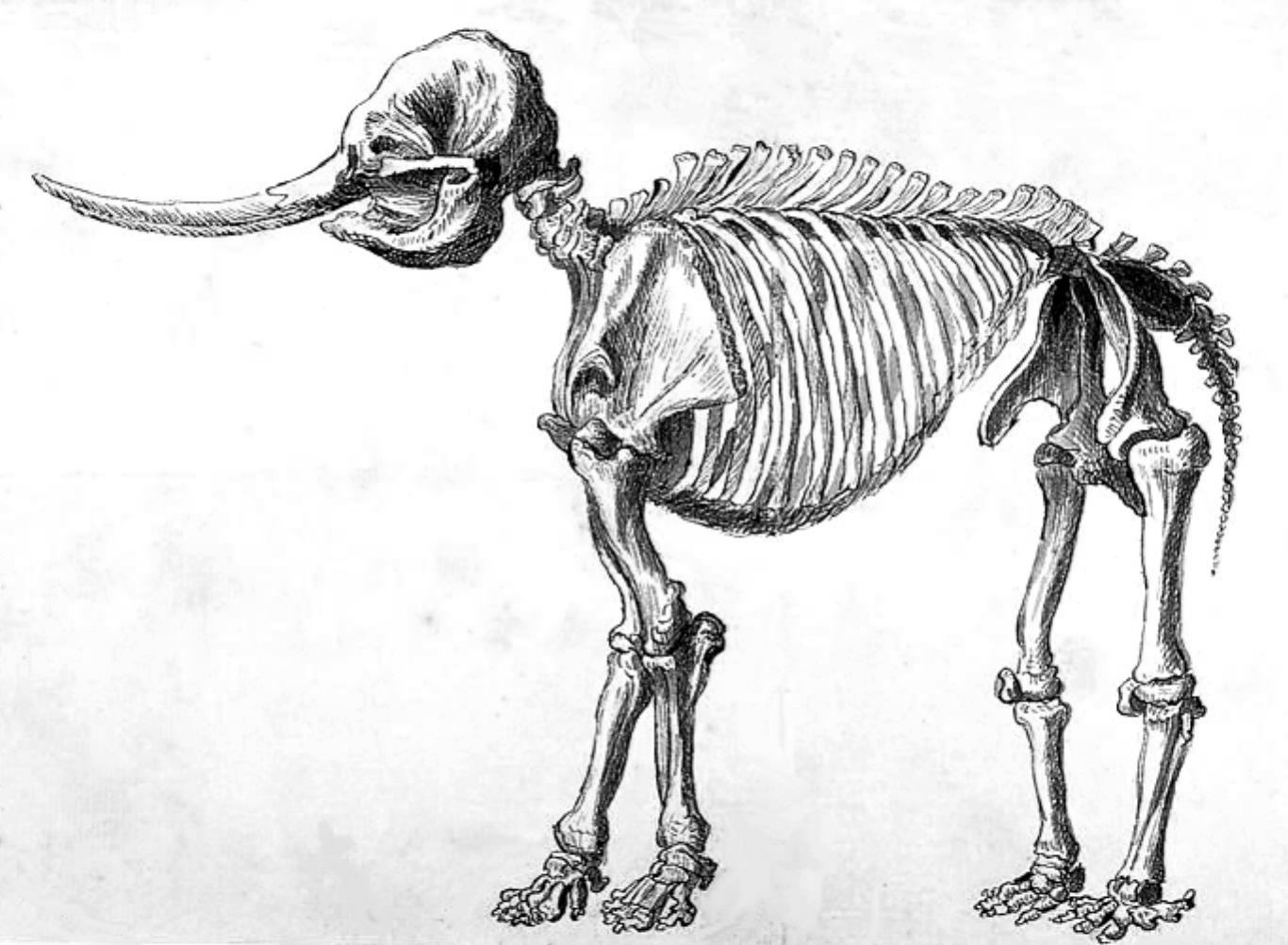
Drawing of a mastodon skeleton by Rembrandt Peale

Mastodons are members of the prehistoric, extinct genus Mammut. They resemble modern elephants.

Native to North America, mastodons are thought to have lived on the North American continent from around 4 million years ago, in the Pliocene Epoch, until their eventual extinction around 8000 BC.

== Discovery ==
In 1900, archaeologist James Hampson documented the discovery of skeletal remains of a mastodon on Island No. 35 of the Mississippi River, in Tipton County, Tennessee. The site of the prehistoric find is approximately 3 miles (4.8 km) east of Reverie, Tennessee. During heavy rain in June 1900, sand at the point bar of Island No. 35 had been washed away, exposing the mastodon skeleton in the sediment when the water retreated from the sandbar the following month.

John Pendleton, a resident of Island No. 35, notified his neighbor James Hampson about unusual bones he had found exposed by the retreating water at the head of the river island. Reportedly, Hampson visited the site of the find "2 or 3 weeks" after the prehistoric bones had been discovered. By the time of Hampson's arrival, many of the bones had been stolen and the skeleton had been considerably damaged by "curiosity seekers" and "ivory hunters". The remainder of the skeleton ("mainly parts of the hind leg and pelvis") were excavated by Hampson with the help of a pick to separate the mastodon bones from the gravel and pebbles in which they had been resting "cemented together by a clay".

Although this find was initially believed to be the remains of a single animal, Morse and Morse subsequently reported that the site consisted of at least two separate mastodons. Several human artifacts were recovered in possible association with the skeletal remains. However, these materials lack direct provenance, and it is generally believed that the artifacts and skeletal remains do not represent Paleoindian/Paleoelephant interaction.

== Today ==
In 1957, the site was reported as destroyed.

The remaining mastodon bones are on display in the Hampson Museum State Park. The Tipton County Museum in Covington also exhibits some fossilized mastodon bones.

== See also ==
- List of archaeological sites in Tennessee
