= Campbell Archeological Site =

Archaeological site in Missouri, US

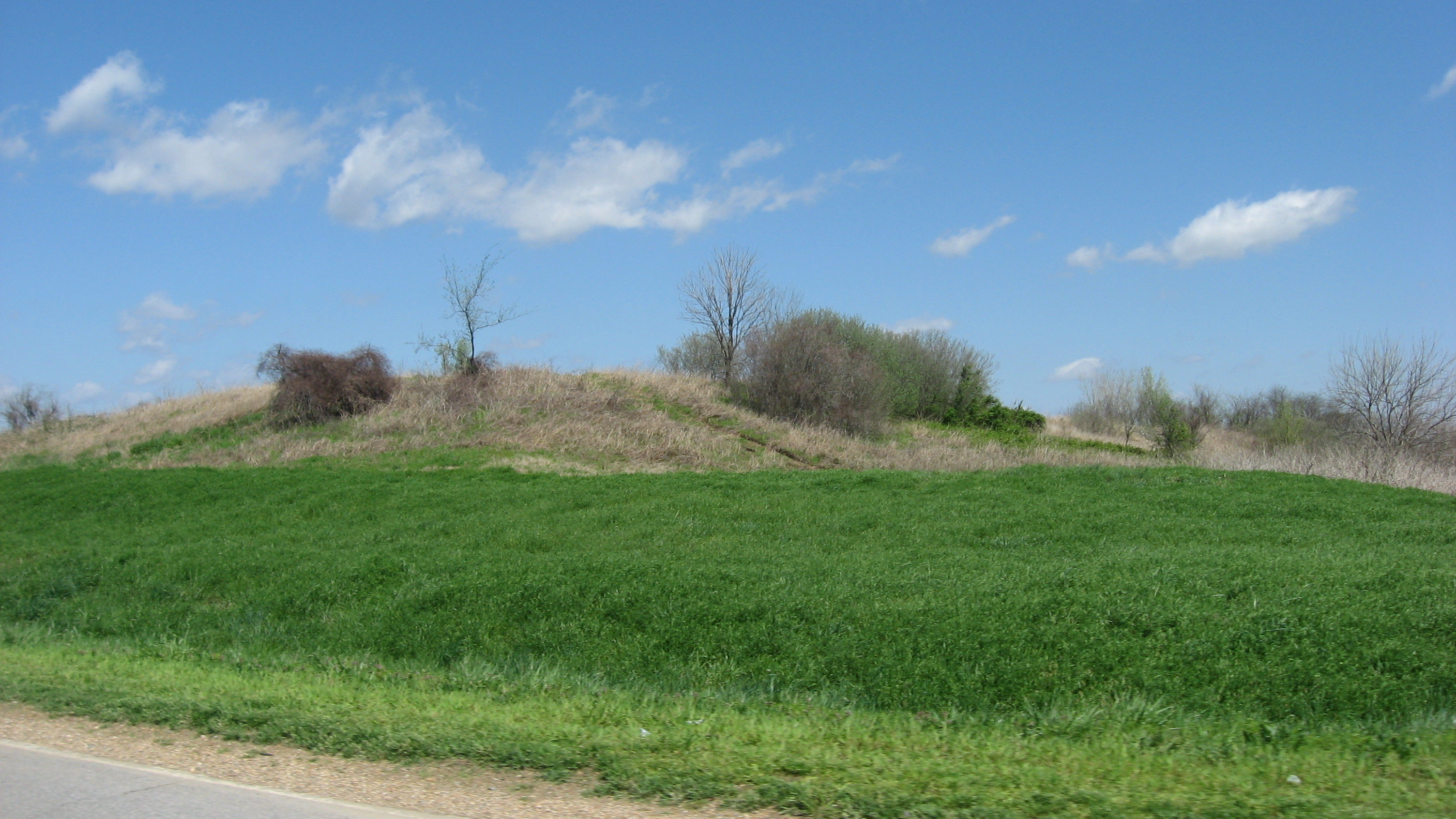
- Platform mound

- Location within Missouri today
- 36°2′42″N 89°47′51″W
- Periods: Nodena phase
- Cultures: Late Mississippian culture
- Location: Cooter, Missouri, Pemiscot County, Missouri, US
- Region: Pemiscot County, Missouri

History
- Built: 1350 CE
- Abandoned: 1541 CE

Site notes
- Architectural styles: platform mound, plaza, village
- Excavation dates: 1954 to 1968
- Archaeologists: Leo O. Anderson, Professor Carl Chapman
- Campbell Archeological Site
- U.S. National Register of Historic Places
- Nearest city: Cooter, Missouri
- NRHP reference No.: 74001086
- Added to NRHP: 1974-07-24

The Campbell Archeological Site (23PM5), is an archaeological site in Southeastern Missouri occupied by the Late Mississippian Period Nodena phase from 1350 to 1541 CE. The site features a large platform mound and village area, as well as several cemeteries. The site was excavated by amateur archaeologist Leo O. Anderson and Professor Carl Chapman from 1954 to 1968 and subsequently published the first material on the site in 1955. The site has yielded the largest number of Spanish artifacts of any prehistoric site in Southeastern Missouri. Finds at the site included glass chevron beads, a Clarksdale bell, iron knife fragments and part of a brass book binder. It was added to the NRHP on July 24, 1974, as NRIS number 74001086.

Located on the southern corner of the junction of Old and New Franklin Ditches, just east of the city of Cooter, the site has yielded prolific numbers of quartz pebbles and stone tools made of flint. Projectile points from the site are largely of two types: basic triangles and a "willow-leaf" shape that has been found at the Nodena site and many similar sites to the south. Multiple cemeteries were found at the site; the first to be excavated was a small area just northeast of the main temple mound, at which eighteen skeletons were found. Grave goods were found with some burials, and bundle burial was also practiced.

Mississippian culture pottery was the most abundant artifact found at the Campbell Site. The types identified as Bell Plan and Neeley's Ferry Plain made up 58% of the total sherds found on the surface. Bell Plain dominated with 38.9%, and Neeley's Ferry Plain composed 19.4%. The only other pottery types of numerical significance were Old Town Red and Kent Incised, representing a little more than 4% and 1% of the total respectively. Numerically insignificant types included Walls Engraved, Carson Red on Buff, and Hollywood White Filmed; Chapman and Anderson suggested that they were funerary wares only, since Walls Engraved and Carson Red on Buff types were found in the graves.

== See also ==
- Eaker site
- List of Mississippian sites
