= Henry Lowry =

Henry Lowry may refer to:

- Henry Berry Lowry (c. 1845 – after 1872), American outlaw
- Henry Dawson Lowry (1869–1906), English journalist, short story writer, novelist and poet
- Henry Lowry (died 1921), African-American man murdered by white vigilantes in Arkansas, see lynching of Henry Lowry

== See also ==
- Henry Lowry-Corry (disambiguation)
