= Reverie, Tennessee =

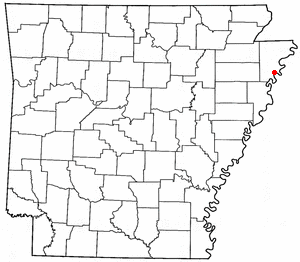
- Location of Reverie, Tennessee, on the state map of Arkansas
- Coordinates: 35°32′17″N 89°59′24″W
- Country: United States
- State: Tennessee
- Counties: Tipton County

Government
  - Community type: Unincorporated
- Elevation: 240 ft (73 m)

Population (2000) of the Reverie voting precinct
  - Total: 11
- Time zone: UTC-6 (CST)
  - Summer (DST): UTC-5 (CDT)
- ZIP codes: Reverie TN, AR 72395; Wilson, AR 72395

Reverie is an unincorporated community in Tipton County, Tennessee, United States. In 2001, the population was 11.

Although occurring decades later, the landscape changes caused by the 1811–1812 New Madrid earthquakes over a period of about 24 hours on March 7, 1876, naturally and nearly spontaneously caused the Mississippi River to abandon its former channel that coincided with the Tennessee–Arkansas border, and establish a new channel east of Reverie. This places Reverie on the Arkansas side, while most of the area of Tipton County is located east of the Mississippi River, the Tennessee side. The formation of the new Centennial Cut-off, named for the US centennial, and the abandonment of the stretch of river formerly known as the Devil's Elbow, led to a 1918 Supreme Court case (Arkansas v. Tennessee) on whether the border should be moved with the river.

In 1900, a mastodon skeleton was discovered 3 miles (4.8 km) east of Reverie.

In the first half of the 20th century, archeological artifacts from an aboriginal village dated AD 1400-1650 were found about 4 miles (6.4 km) northeast of Reverie, at the Nodena site.

== Demographics ==
According to the United States Census, in 2000 the total population of the Reverie voting precinct was 11. The entire population was non-Hispanic white at that time.

=== Education ===
The state of Tennessee pays for the children in the population to attend schools in Arkansas.

== Economy ==
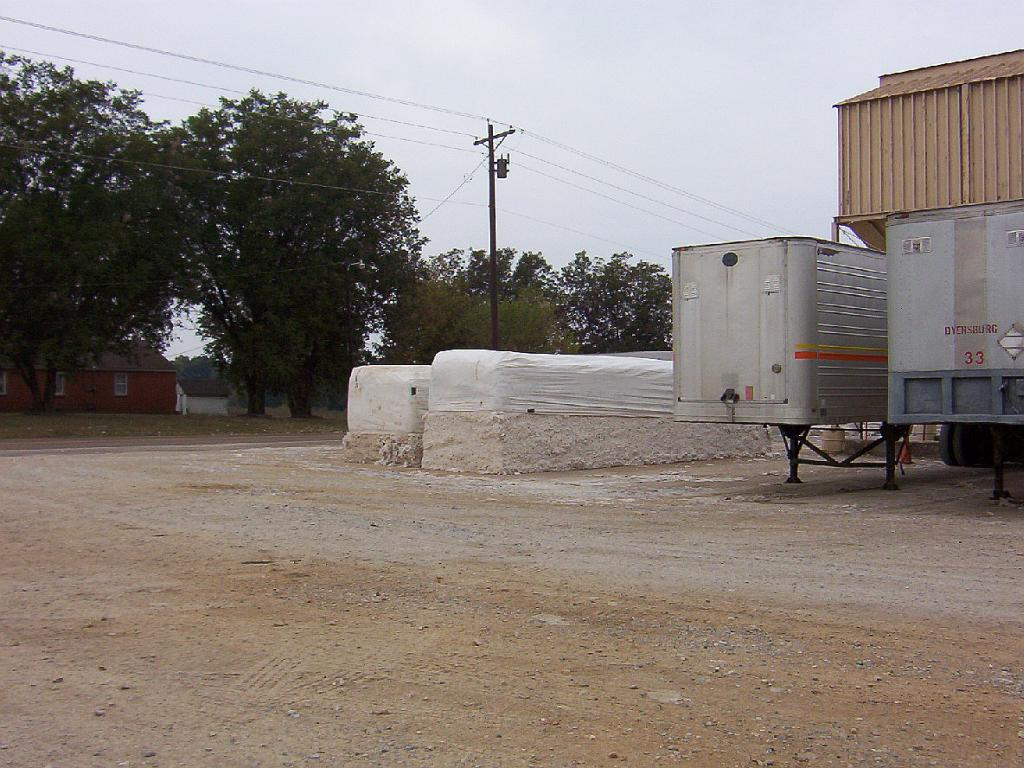
Modern cotton processing

Agriculture is the dominant source of income in the area surrounding Reverie, especially the cultivation of cotton. After the abolition of slavery, sharecropping was the primary means of income for families in the area, mostly for the cultivation of cotton. Modern machines such as the cotton picker have made the manual cultivation obsolete over time as they took over the work from the hand laborers. As a result of the lessened need for agricultural laborers, the population of the area has dropped in recent decades.

In 2007, farming and remote work are the two most available industries in Reverie.

== History ==
Founded in the 1800s, Reverie is one of the early settlements in Tipton County. In 1883, a US Post office was opened that in 2007 is no longer in existence.

=== Prehistoric mastodon skeleton ===
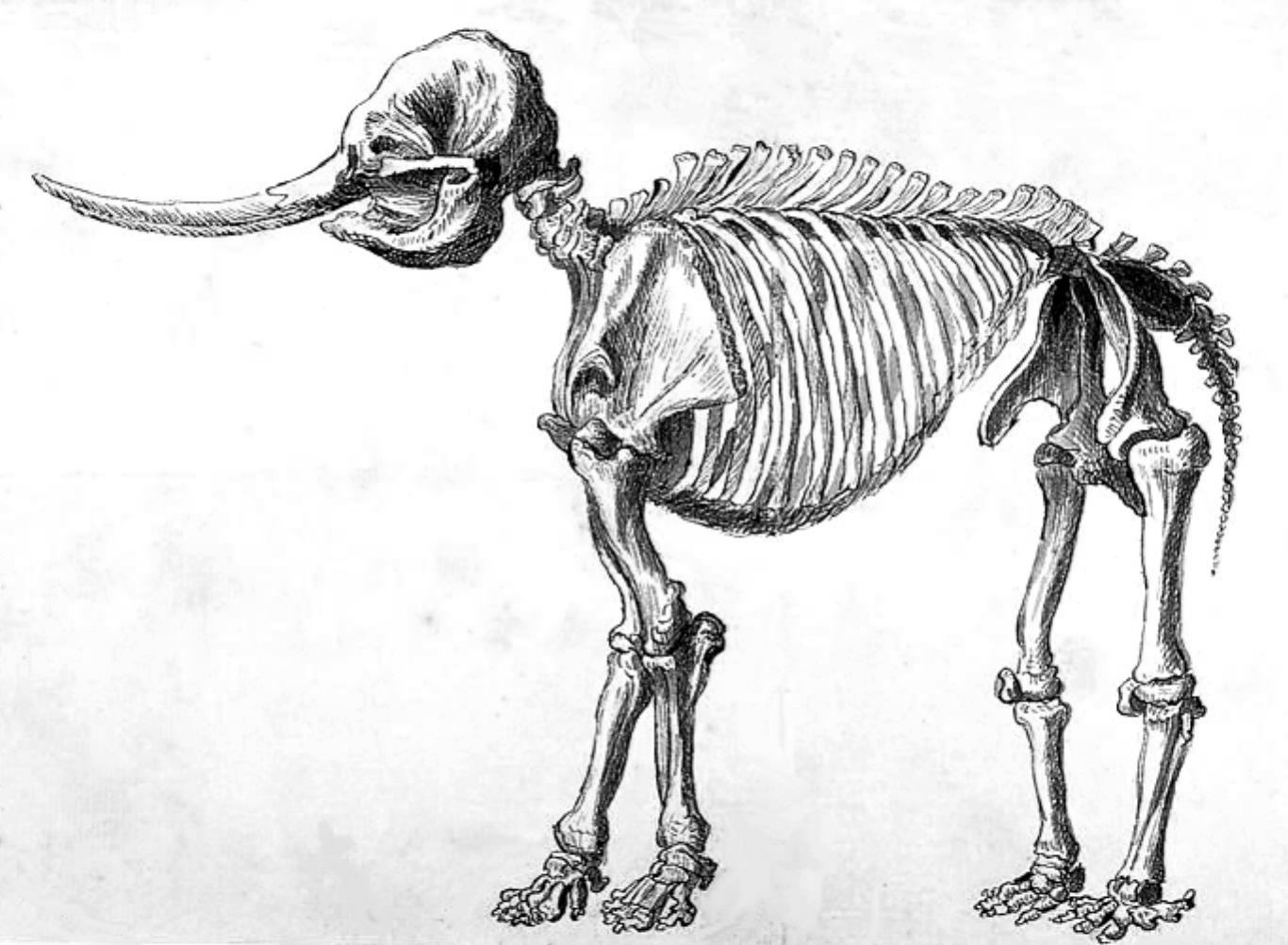
Mastodon skeleton

Mastodons are members of the extinct prehistoric genus Mammut that resemble modern elephants. Native to North America they lived on the North American continent from almost 4 million years ago until their eventual disappearance about 10,000 years ago.

In 1900, archaeologist James K. Hampson documented the find of skeletal remains of a mastodon on Island No. 35 of the Mississippi River, approximately 3 miles (4.8 km) east of Reverie and 23 miles (37 km) south of Blytheville, Arkansas.

In 1957, the site was reported as destroyed.

=== Aboriginal village AD 1400-1650 ===
About 4 miles (6.4 km) northeast of Reverie, at the Nodena site, artifacts from a 15-acre (6.1 ha) aboriginal village dated 1400–1650 CE were found in the first half of the 20th century.

A collection of these artifacts is on display at the Hampson Museum State Park in Wilson, Arkansas.

In 1964, the Nodena site was declared a National Historic Landmark. In 1966 it was added to the National Register of Historic Places.

== Geography ==
=== Location and landscape ===
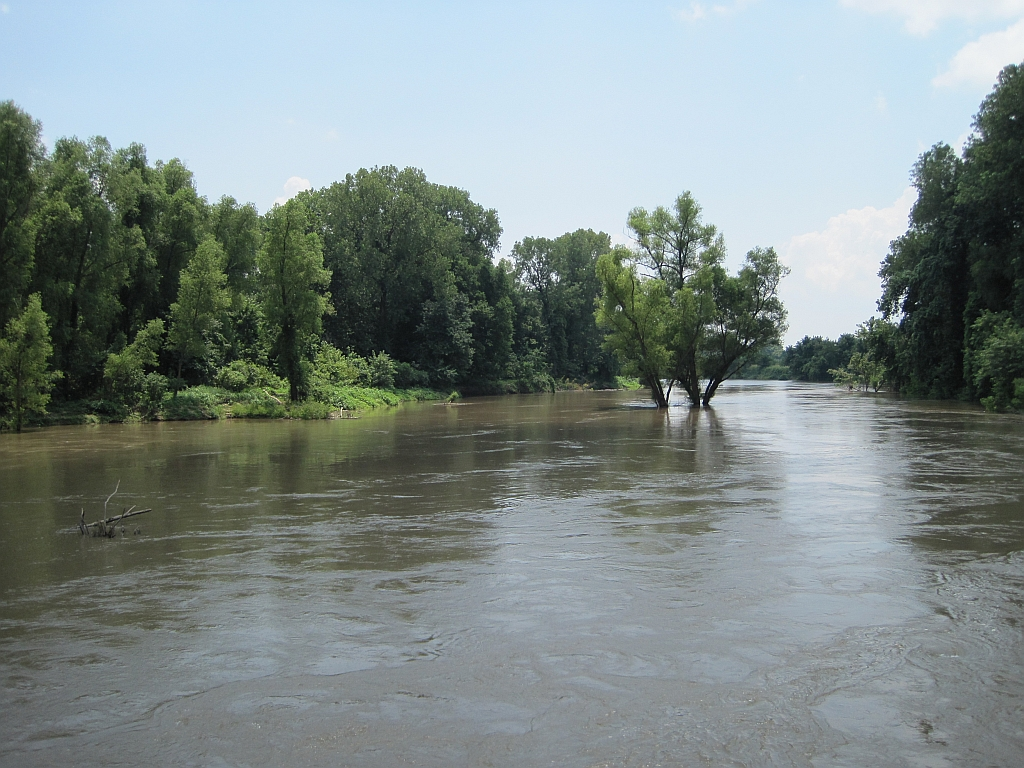
View to the NE along the Mississippi riverbed (2010)

Reverie is located at 35°32′17″N 89°59′24″W. The coordinates mark the location of the historical post office. The elevation above sea level is 239 feet (73 m).

The landscape is dominated by the Mississippi River flood plains, fields, and few trees.

=== Mississippi River Island No. 35 ===
When the border between Tennessee and Arkansas was established in 1795, it followed the middle of the Mississippi River. At that time, the river ran northwest of Reverie. After the avulsion of 1876, the Mississippi River ran southeast of Reverie, cutting it off from Tipton County.

Today, Reverie is surrounded by the modern Mississippi River in the southeast and the sidearms following the 1795 course in the northwest. Although the sidearms are only partially connected most of the time, Reverie is located on what topographically is Island No. 35 of the Mississippi River, because it is surrounded by water on all sides.

=== County seat Covington, Tennessee ===
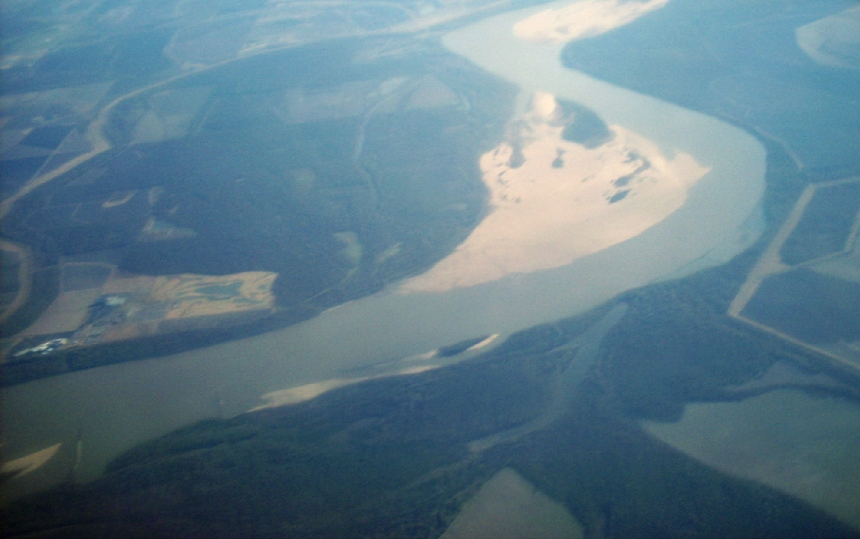
A meander in a river can be cut off, creating a new island.

The direct distance between Reverie and the county seat, Covington, Tennessee, is only 18 miles (29 km).

As of 2007, the road trip to Covington required the driver to go via Memphis, Tennessee, and was longer than 83 miles (134 km).

=== Postal ===
The postal address and ZIP code for the community used to be Reverie TN, AR 72395. The ZIP code is cross referenced with Wilson, Arkansas. United States Postal Service recommends using Wilson, AR 72395 for Reverie.

== Notes ==
Aerial views of the Reverie area with superimposed state borders illustrate the course of the Mississippi River in this area before and after the 1876 avulsion. The state line is following the pre-cutoff riverbed as of 1795. In 2007, the Mississippi River was located about 3.5 miles (5,6 km) southeast of the Tennessee/Arkansas state border near Reverie.
