= Chickasawba Mound =

Archaeological site in Arkansas, United States

- Chickasawba Mound (3M55)
- U.S. National Register of Historic Places
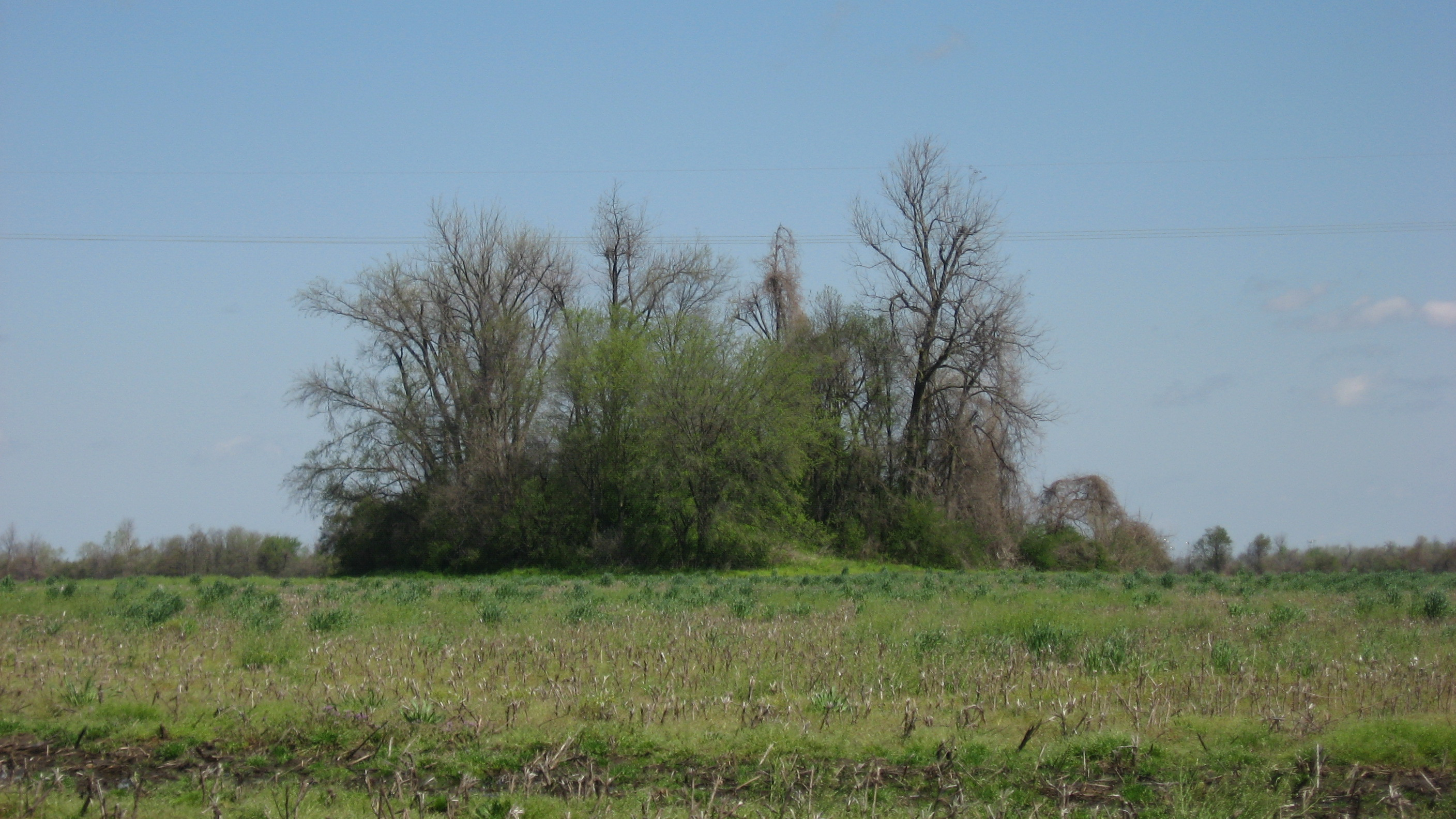
- Nearest city: Blytheville, Arkansas
- Area: 13 acres (5.3 ha)
- NRHP reference No.: 84000217
- Added to NRHP: November 16, 1984

The Chickasawba Mound, designated by the Smithsonian trinomial 3M55, is an archaeological site in Blytheville, Arkansas. It encompasses the remains of a modest Nodena phase town, with a ceremonial mound and evidence of occupation during the 16th century. The site is one of the best-preserved Nodena sites in the region. The site was listed on the National Register of Historic Places in 1984. The site derives its name from Chickasawba, a chief of the Shawnee tribe, said to have been buried at the foot of the mound.

An 1870 article in The Marysville Tribune stated that a "gigantic human skeleton" was found in the mound, though there is little record of its accuracy or any follow-up. The Arkansas Archeological Survey noted that there is evidence to support the claim that human remains can be found in some bluff shelters, but no non-human creatures.

== See also ==
- National Register of Historic Places listings in Mississippi County, Arkansas
