= Lynching of Henry Lowry =

Lynching of an African-American man in 1921

The lynching of Henry Lowry, on January 26, 1921, was the murder of an African-American man, Henry Lowry, by a mob of white vigilantes in Arkansas. Lowry (also spelled "Lowery"), a tenant farmer, had been on the run after a deadly shootout at the house of planter O. T. Craig on Christmas Day of 1920. Lowry went into hiding in El Paso, Texas; when he was discovered and extradited by train, a group of armed white men boarded the train in Sardis, Mississippi, and took Lowry to Nodena, near Wilson, Arkansas. He was doused in gasoline and burned alive before a mob of 500. A reporter from the Memphis Press witnessed the event, and word of the lynching soon spread around the country, aided by an article William Pickens wrote for The Nation, in which he described eastern Arkansas as "the American Congo".

== Description ==
=== Prelude, and shooting at Craig's plantation ===
A detailed account comes from William Pickens, then a journalist and an assistant field secretary for the executive secretary of the NAACP. Pickens is the only source for some details on Lowry; his age, for example, being otherwise unknown except for Pickens's estimate of "forty years or more". He and his wife Callie are not listed in the 14th United States census, despite having moved to Arkansas in 1918 from Mississippi. O. T. Craig was a planter in Mississippi County, Arkansas, first name not given in most contemporary accounts but revealed by the same census records to be Osben T. Craig, aged 68 at the time; with 62-year-old wife Mary, children Elizabeth (28), Richard (24), Margret (21), and two further sons. Craig had a reputation for being ornery: he mistreated his Black tenants and exploited them. Lowry was a proud, tall man; he was over six feet tall and, according to later testimony from another one of Craig's tenants, Mrs. Lucy Oliver, "he didn't take nothing off of nobody". He had attained the highest possible level within his Masonic order, a rank given to those of "outstanding character and leadership qualities".

The shooting and the lynching were consequences of Lowry's indenture with Craig. Weeks before the events, Lowry had come to ask for his settlement, meaning a complete account of all debts and credits, and of how much money, if any, was due to him. Lowry, who had a wife and child and was a hardworking man who did not drink, had come to work for Craig some two years before. Craig was a powerful man and did not want his workers to leave or have freedom of movement; his son Richard was the local postmaster and clerk of the local court. Lowry needed the settlement if he ever wanted to leave, since without it he could not prove that he was not indebted to Craig, but Craig refused to provide the documents. Richard hit Lowry, who left but made a promise he would be back. He did so a few weeks later, while the Craigs were having their Christmas dinner, and was told to leave; Craig hit him with a piece of wood, and then Richard shot Lowry, who pulled his own gun and returned fire, killing O. T. Craig and his wife, and wounding Richard and his brother. Then, he ran.

The story as told locally gave various accounts of the events that led up to the shooting, and it centered on the planter's cook, a young woman named Bessie. It alleges that Lowry attacked her, and that the planter and his son came and defended her from Lowry. Another newspaper said Lowry (inexplicably called "Giles" in part of the report) attacked Craig's wife with a club, and then shot Craig with a .38 when the latter attempted to protect his wife. Pickens calls these stories fictional (with their references to "Negro murderer" and "bad whiskey", and the incongruous account of the cook being outside during the family's dinner, being chased by Lowry) and ridiculed them. Sascha W. Krause argues that giving the "backstory" of a crime committed by the future victim, in all its salacious details and usually dependent on racist tropes, was part and parcel of the lynching rhetoric in which newspapers were complicit.

=== Lowry's escape and capture ===
J. T. Williams, an African-American man who lived near Nodena, hid Lowry on his farm for two days. Lowry was a member of a local Odd Fellows lodge, and was helped by fellow lodge members in his escape to El Paso, Texas. When he left the Williams house, with some six hundred men looking for him, he drenched his shoes with turpentine to throw the hounds off his trail, "a common practice among southern Blacks running for their lives". Fellow members of the Turrell Odd Fellows Lodge helped logistically and financially, including a man named Morris Jenkins and his wife.

Lowry went into hiding in El Paso, Texas, in a Black neighborhood, where he was trying to make enough money to send for his wife, Callie Lowry, and his daughter--they were kept in Craig's backyard (for "protection"). When Lowry wrote to one of his friends in order to relay some news to his wife, the letter was intercepted--the Craigs controlled the local mail--and the recipient and others (and their wives) were thrown in jail. (Note: Guzman says the letter was sent to Morris Jenkins; Schneider says he wrote to his wife.) Lowry's landlady promptly notified the local NAACP chapter, who hired an attorney, Frederick Knollenberg. He, together with a local minister, the local NAACP chapter president, and Lawrence A. Nixon (of Nixon v. Herndon) visited Lowry in prison. Lowry agreed to be extradited, if Arkansas governor Thomas Chipman McRae could guarantee his safety; that promise was made.

McRae's two lawmen went to El Paso and arrested Lowry; they were under orders to take Lowry to Little Rock, to prevent a lynching, but the deputy sheriffs took Lowry back by way of New Orleans, "so as to bring him to the waiting mob in Mississippi County", according to Pickens, and the mob received a telegram to meet the train in Sardis, Mississippi. An armed group "overwhelmed" the deputies in Sardis on January 26, and took Lowry back by car (through three states) to Nodena, near Wilson, Arkansas. Some of them stopped in Memphis to tell the local newspapers that the lynching was to happen at 6 that evening.

=== The lynching ===
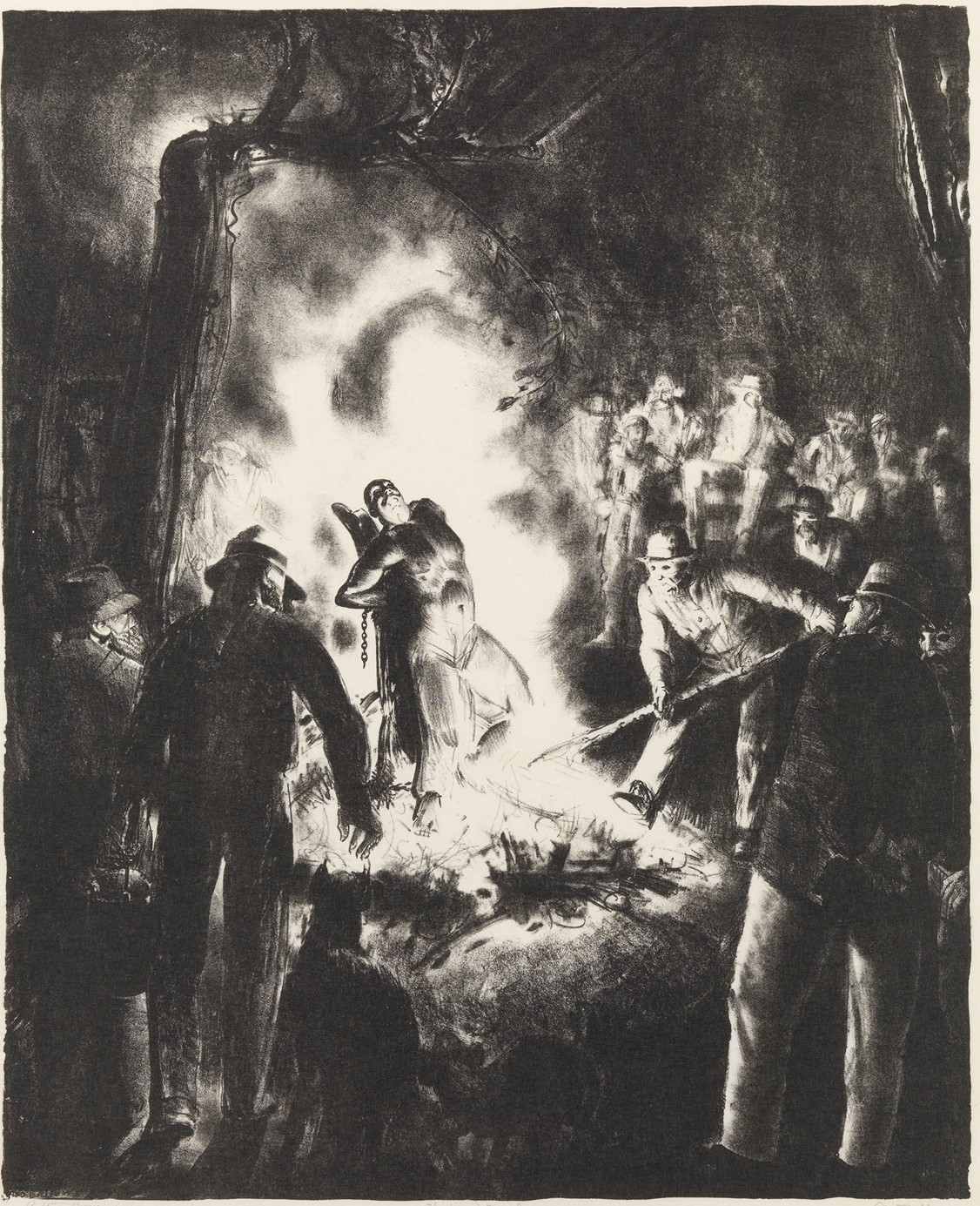
The Law Is Too Slow (1923) by George Bellows

Ralph Roddy, a reporter for the Memphis Press, gave a detailed account of events. While the plan had been to kill Lowry at the Craig farm, the growing size of the mob prevented that, and after the victim had been moved a little way from a place called Harrison's Landing, it was decided to kill him where they were, in a "natural amphitheater between two bluffs, with the Mississippi on one side and a huge lake, caused by backwater, on the other". The place was in sight of the Craig farm and in front of the house of J. T. Williams, who had hidden Lowry on his farm for two days after the Christmas Day shooting.

Lowry was slowly burned alive, with leaves and gasoline. He asked to be buried in Magnolia, Mississippi, and at the end called out to appeal to a lodge of which he was a member. Throughout the ordeal, he never begged for mercy, and attempted to shield his family. Reportedly, O. T. Craig's sons attended the lynching. The mob also wished to murder Jenkins (who was held in Marion, Alabama) and Williams (in Blytheville, Arkansas), but apparently bad weather, impassable roads, and the day's exertions were too much for them.

== Legacy and significance ==
Pickens's article on the lynching describes the Mississippi valley (Arkansas, Louisiana, western Tennessee, Mississippi, eastern Texas) as an American version of the Congo, but unlike King Leopold of Belgium's Congo Free State, it was an economy of cotton and sugar, not ivory and rubber. Besides that, there are great similarities: "Here labor is forced, and the laborer is a slave". He analyzes the system of sharecropping, in which even the smallest of debts means that a debtor can be held in bondage; moreover, Pickens argues, this is a part of America in which the law, particularly the Thirteenth Amendment, holds no currency, and where violent mobs and terrible lynchings are a normal part of the economic system. The case of Henry Lowry combines all these elements though, as Pickens concluded, it did not sink as low as other lynchings: "The mob did not fumble in the ashes for the charred bones and other 'souvenirs' as is usual in such Southern Roman holidays".

Harry Haywood and Milton Howard opened their pamphlet Lynching: A Weapon of National Oppression (1932) with a description of Lowry's death, taken from a January 27, 1921, article from the Memphis Press. James Weldon Johnson, poet and Civil Rights activist, was also outraged, and used the same description of Lowry's death for "American Barbarism"; such content was frequently featured in pamphlets and articles used for member recruitment and fundraising for organizations like the NAACP. Johnson commented, "In the whole history of lynching in the United States, there is not a more revolting chapter than the one written last week in the State of Arkansas."

Lodges with Black membership also came under increased scrutiny. These fraternal orders and secret societies formed a danger to the establishment; they were "a locus for political activity" and their national organizations were able to provide assistance to local groups, including with migration north on a large scale. Such societies were also suspect for fear of an uprising, and in Pine Bluff, Arkansas, "negro lodges...were very strong and their leaders were known to advocate equal wages, political offices, and social equality for the colored people". That Lowry had been assisted by lodge members caused at least one local newspaper to call for the authorities to destroy these organizations, because they were "inciting the Southern negro".

The NAACP put an account of the lynching in a pamphlet entitled An American Lynching: Being the Burning at Stake of Henry Lowry at Nodena, Arkansas, January 26, 1921, as Told in American Newspapers, and delivered a copy to every member of the U.S. Congress as it was deliberating the Dyer Anti-Lynching Bill. The NAACP also sent copies to newspaper editors in South America, Asia, and Europe. It received many positive responses, in particular from the Asian Review which in no uncertain terms denounced the hypocrisy of the people of United States championing justice and humanity whilst at the same time perpetrating "the foulest deed ever conceived" and allowing the offenders to go unpunished.

Modern scholars have placed the lynching in a socioeconomic context. For historian Will Guzman, in his 2015 study Civil Rights in the Texas Borderlands, the lynching of Henry Lowry exemplified the economic oppression suffered by sharecroppers, and Black sharecroppers specifically, and the killing was the result of the financial and physical entrapment that was part and parcel of the system. Jeannie M. Whayne, historian at the University of Arkansas, also places the lynching in the socioeconomic context of the planter system, and calls it a "carefully orchestrated event" meant to vilify Blacks and unite whites of all social classes, and she cites Sheriff Dwight H. Blackwood, who was also quoted in Roddy's article in the Memphis Press, saying that "every man, woman, and child in the county was determined to have Lowry burned". Whayne also notes how the events leading to the shooting were misrepresented by the newspapers, as an example of the complicity of the press in the white supremacist sharecropping system in which the local police cooperated with the planters.
