= Henry Lowry-Corry =

Henry Lowry-Corry may refer to:

- Henry Lowry-Corry (1803–1873), British MP for Tyrone 1825–1873, son of the 2nd Earl Belmore, First Lord of the Admiralty
- Henry Lowry-Corry (1845–1927), British MP for Tyrone 1873–1880, son of the 3rd Earl Belmore
