= Eaker site =

Archaeological site in Arkansas

- Eaker Site
- U.S. National Register of Historic Places
- U.S. National Historic Landmark
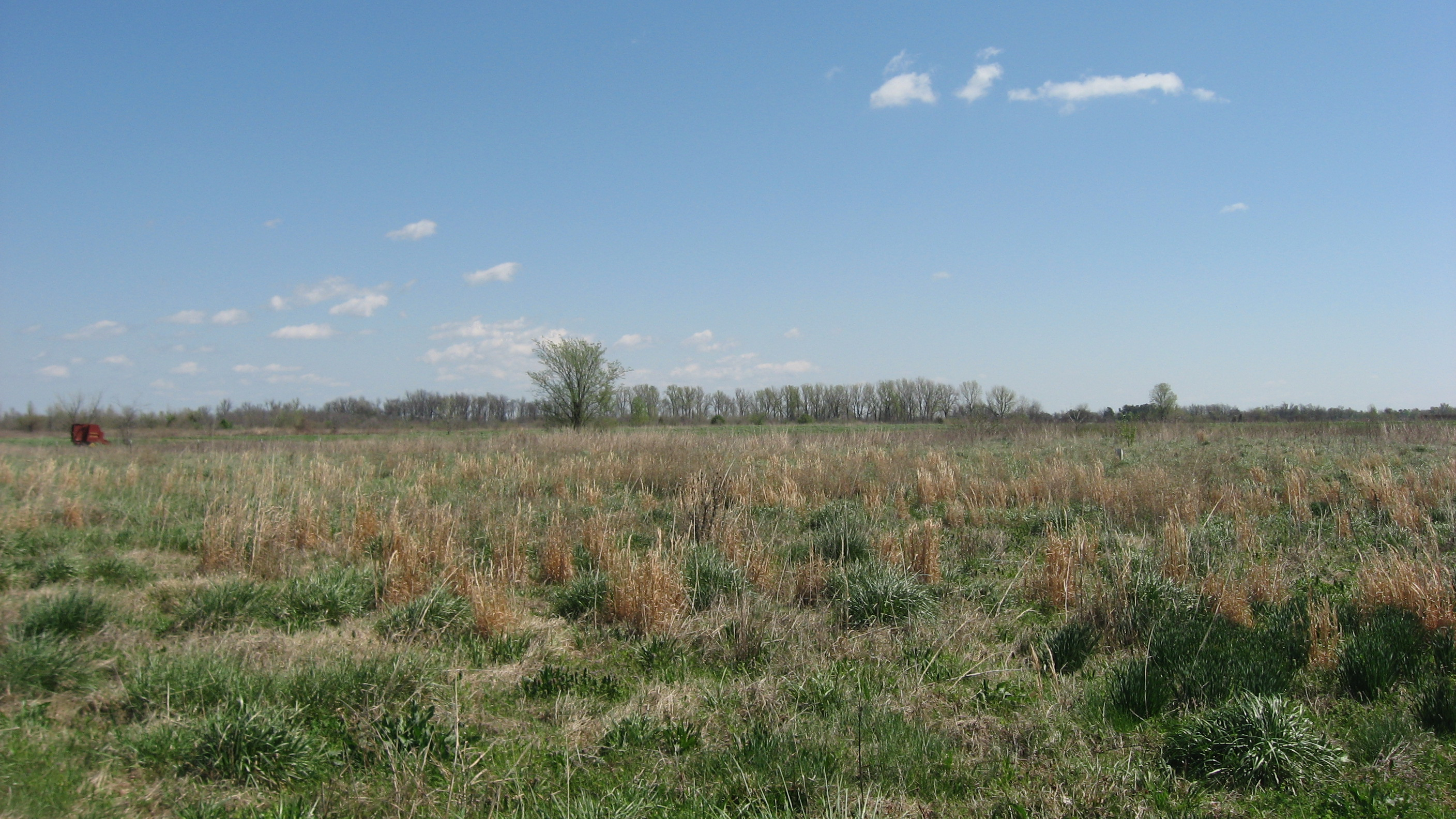
- Overview of the site

- Location within Arkansas Location within the United States
- Nearest city: Blytheville, Arkansas
- Coordinates: 35°57′48″N 89°56′4″W
- Area: 80 acres (32 ha)
- NRHP reference No.: 91001048

Significant dates
- Added to NRHP: November 25, 1992
- Designated NHL: June 19, 1996

The Eaker Site (3MS105) is an archaeological site on Eaker Air Force Base near Blytheville, Arkansas, that was declared a National Historic Landmark in 1996. The site is the largest and most intact Late Mississippian Nodena phase village site within the Central Mississippi Valley, with archaeological evidence indicating a palisaded village some 50 acres (20 ha) in size, with hundreds of structures. The site's major period of occupation was 1350–1450 CE, although evidence of occupation dates back to 600 CE. The site is also hypothesized to have been occupied by the Quapaw prior to a migration further south, after which they made contact with Europeans in the late 17th century.

== Description and archaeological history ==
The Eaker Site is located in northeastern Arkansas, overlooking Pemiscot Bayou, a tributary of the St. Francis River. It is an area that saw little development before 1900, when agricultural endeavors resulted in the drainage of local swamps. The property was acquired by the United States Air Force in 1942, and has been part of Blytheville Air Force Base/Eaker Air Force Base since then.

The site was first recorded in 1973, although its location was incorrectly given, and was not corrected until 1978, when an amateur archaeologist collected samples from the site. Preliminary surveys were made in 1980 and 1982 by state archaeologists, and in 1988 a full investigation established the boundaries of the 80-acre (32 ha) site. This work yielded more than 100 projectile points and over 2,000 pottery fragments. A portion of the site has since been surveyed using a magnetometer, identifying a significant number of subsurface features of interest, including as many as 400 house sites. Excavations have yielded evidence of refuse middens, houses, toolmaking workshops, and human remains.

The most significant damage to the site took place shortly after the Air Force occupation in 1942, when a portion of a platform mound was apparently used as fill for one of the airfield runways. A mound-like feature in the northeast of the site is believed to represent the surviving element of this structure.

== Analysis ==
According to the archaeological finds, the site appears to have been occupied several times between about 600 CE and 1500 CE. The pottery finds are similar in distribution to those found at the Nodena Site, and the Nodena period (1350–1450 CE) is when this site appears to have been occupied to its greatest extent. This occupation included a large village, occupying about 50 acres (20 ha) of the site, which was surrounded by a wooden palisade and ditch. The southern 30 acres (12 ha) have evidence of Late Woodland Period occupation.

The site is significant for its size, which should enable archaeologists to uncover substantial evidence about the society which occupied it, including information such as social stratification (as indicated by differing burial practices, and the arrangement of structures in the village), and trading patterns with surrounding communities. It may also yield valuable information about agricultural practices, given its location in a place favorable for such uses.

The site was listed on the National Register of Historic Places in 1992, and designated a National Historic Landmark in 1996.

== See also ==
- Nodena Site
- Parkin Archeological State Park
- Menard-Hodges site
- Mississippian culture
- List of Mississippian sites
- List of National Historic Landmarks in Arkansas
- National Register of Historic Places in Mississippi County, Arkansas
