= Nodena site =

Archaeological site in Arkansas, United States

- Nodena Site
- U.S. National Register of Historic Places
- U.S. National Historic Landmark
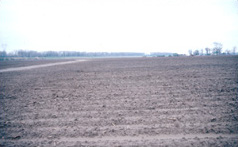
- Fields at the Nodena Site

- Location within Arkansas Location within the United States
- Nearest city: Wilson, Arkansas
- Coordinates: 35°36′9″N 89°58′45″W
- Area: 305 acres (123 ha)
- NRHP reference No.: 66000201

Significant dates
- Added to NRHP: October 15, 1966
- Designated NHL: February 19, 1964

The Nodena Site is an archeological site east of Wilson, Arkansas, and northeast of Reverie, Tennessee, in Mississippi County, Arkansas, United States. Around 1400–1650 CE an aboriginal palisaded village existed in the Nodena area on a meander bend of the Mississippi River. The Nodena Site was discovered and first documented by James K. Hampson, archaeologist and owner of the plantation on which the Nodena Site is located. Artifacts from this site are on display in the Hampson Museum State Park in Wilson, Arkansas. The Nodena Site is the type site for the Nodena phase, believed by many archaeologists to be the province of Pacaha visited by the Spanish explorer Hernando de Soto in 1542.

In 1900, a prehistoric mastodon skeleton was discovered 2 miles (3.2 km) south of the Nodena Site. In 1964, the Nodena Site was declared a National Historic Landmark and in 1966 it was added to the National Register of Historic Places.

== Culture of the Nodena people ==
Nodena is the type site for an important Late Mississippian cultural component, the Nodena phase, which dates from about 1400–1700 CE. The Nodena phase was a collection of villages (see Eaker site) along the Mississippi River between the Missouri Bootheel and Wapanocca Lake. This culture is contemporary with the Menard complex, Tipton phase, Walls phase and Parkin phase. The Parkin Indian Mound, the type site for the Parkin phase, is the site of another Late Mississippian village located in Parkin, Arkansas, about 30 miles (50 km) southwest of Wilson. In the early 1540s, the Spanish Hernando de Soto expedition is believed to have visited several sites in the Nodena phase, which is usually identified as the province of Pacaha. The Parkin site is a candidate for the province of Casqui. Nodena people were part of the Southeastern Ceremonial Complex, an extensive religious and trade network that brought chert, whelk shells, and other exotic goods to the site.

=== Nodena village 1400–1650 CE ===
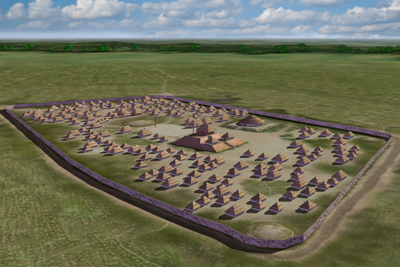
Artist's conception of the Nodena Site at its height

The site was a 15 acres (6 ha) palisaded village on a horseshoe bend of the Mississippi River about 5 miles (8 km) east of Wilson, Arkansas. Archaeological artifacts from the villages of the Nodena people are dated to 1400–1650 CE.

The site had three to eight mounds, two of them large substructure mounds. The largest, designated as "Mound A", was 111 feet (34 m) wide by 120 feet (37 m) long, and 15.5 feet (5 m) high. It had two levels, with the top being 40 feet (12 m) by 60 feet (18 m), and the terrace level being 30 feet (9 m) wide. The remains of three structures were found on the mound, one on the top level and two on the terrace level. The mound designated as "Mound B" was 117 feet (36 m) by 111 feet (34 m) by 4 feet (1.2 m) tall. It had the remains of a 60 feet (18 m) diameter round structure found at its summit. The site also had several large plaza areas, and what Hampson described as a "chunkey field", which was located directly behind Mound A. A circular mound, designated as "Mound C", was located at the other end of the chunkey field. It was roughly 93 feet (28 m) in diameter and 3 feet (0.9 m) high. A large number of male graves, 314 of 316, were found buried under it.

The houses in the village were laid out in a very orderly fashion, located on the same axis as the mounds at the site, demonstrating that the whole site was planned. Members of the de Soto Entrada described the villages of the Pacaha and Nodena peoples as being the most carefully planned and organized of all the villages they had seen in "La Florida", which was what they called the entire southeast. The villages of this area were described as having few if any trees, probably because this was the primary source of fuel and building materials. Many trees close to the villages would have been cut down for these purposes. Homes were built from wattle and daub, with thatched roofs. The palisade which surrounded the site was designed for defensive purposes. It had bastions at regular intervals, with archer slots to defend against enemy attacks. The peoples of Casqui and Pacaha were in a state of perpetual war with one another, and most large sites throughout the area in this time period had this type of defensive palisade.

The de Soto chroniclers indicate that political provinces characterized by a paramount chief living in a paramount town, with satellite vassal towns surrounding it, were the major political institutions of this area. The Nodena Site was either the main town or one of the larger satellite towns of the Pacaha province.

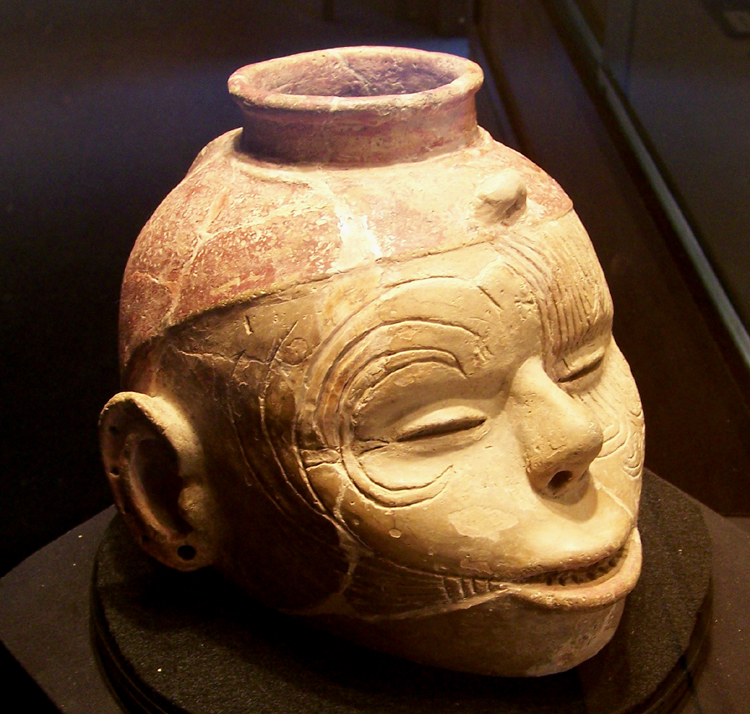
Human head effigy pot at the Hampson Museum

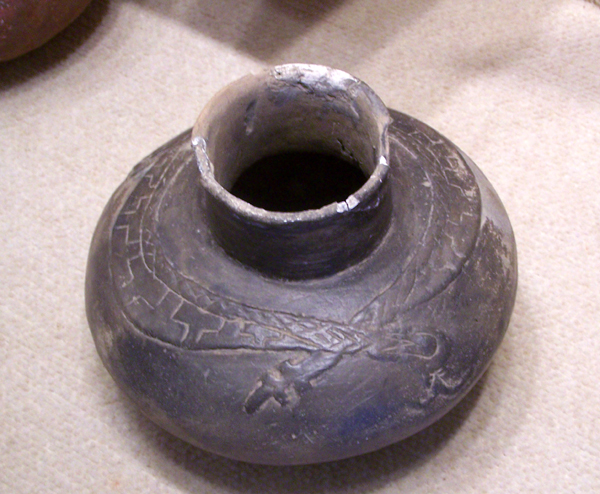
Southeastern Ceremonial Complex ogee motif pot from the Nodena Site

=== Pottery ===
Most pottery found at the Nodena Site is of the kind known as Mississippian Bell Plain. It was buff colored, contains large fragments of ground mussel shell as a tempering agent, and isn't as smooth and polished as other varieties. Other kinds found there are much finer, with a finer ground shell as a temper, some instances being so finely ground as to look untempered. The Nodena phase people put a bowl and a bottle into a grave with the bodies, usually of the finer variety of pottery. Shapes and decoration were varied in the mortuary pottery, from brightly colored abstract spiral designs, to elaborate effigy vessels depicting human heads, animals, and hunters and their prey. Pottery made by the Nodena people was built up from strips of clay, and then smoothed out by the potter, much like other pottery in the Eastern America area where the potter's wheel was unknown. Slips using galena for white, hematite for red, and sometimes graphite for black were used to paint the pottery, with a red on white swastika design being particularly popular. Sometimes incising was used (an example is the incised raptor image on the effigy head pot pictured), although it is rare in Nodena pottery.

=== Head deformation ===
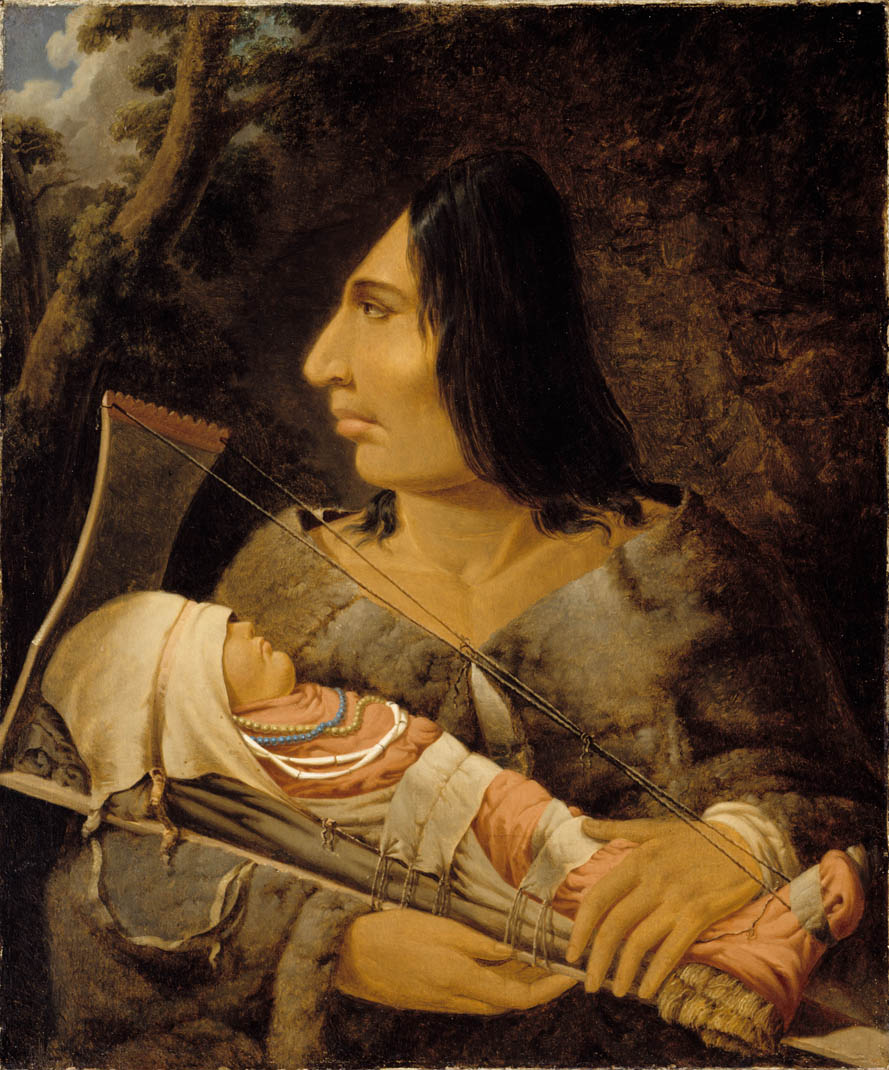
Painting by artist Paul Kane showing a Chinookan woman with a deformed skull and an infant in a cradle designed to deform the skull

The people of the Nodena phase practiced artificial cranial deformation or head flattening. Shortly after infants were born, they were strapped to a special carrier which deformed their skulls as they grew. Many of the skeletal remains found at the Nodena Site had deformed skulls, of the type defined as fronto-occipital deformation, flattening of the forehead and the back of the head. Of 123 skulls found by Dr. Hampson, only six could be considered "normal", meaning they did not show the signs of head deformation. The functioning of the brain is not affected by cranial deformation, but the overall shape of the skull bones are. This practice was performed by many Native American tribes into historic times, including the Choctaw, although it later fell out of favor.

=== Agriculture and food ===
The people of Nodena were intensely involved in maize agriculture, as well as other food crops originating in the Americas, such as beans, squash, sunflowers and gourds. They also gathered wild foodstuffs such as pecans and persimmons. The de Soto chroniclers described the area as being under heavy cultivation, and the most populous they had seen in La Florida. The Spaniards described groves of wild fruit and nut bearing trees, implying that the Nodena must have left them standing when clearing other trees for the cultivation of maize. The hunting of whitetail deer, squirrel, rabbit, turkey, and mallard was practiced as well as fishing for alligator gar, catfish, drum, and mussels.

=== Language ===
The peoples of Nodena were probably Tunican or Siouan speaking. It is known that the Tunica were in the area at the time of the de Soto Entrada, and the related group of phases present in the region may have all been Tunican speakers, with Caddoan speakers to their west and south. But by the time of later European contact in the 1670s and the beginning of the historic period, the area was occupied by the Dhegiha Siouan speaking Quapaw. Attempts have been made to connect pottery styles and words from the de Soto narratives with historic tribes, but have so far been unsuccessful.

== Dr. James K. Hampson ==
The museum for the Nodena Site is named after James K. Hampson (1877–1956), owner of the Hampson Plantation on which the site is located, and the first archaeologist to excavate and preserve its artifacts and to document their discovery. The Hampson Museum State Park in Wilson, Arkansas exhibits an archeological collection of early American Indian artifacts from the Nodena Site. Cultivation of crops, hunting, social life, religion and politics of that ancient civilization are topics of the exhibition. Stone and shell artifacts as well as pottery are on display to illustrate the culture of the Nodena people.

== Prehistoric Mastodon skeleton ==
Mastodons are members of the prehistoric, extinct genus Mammut; they resemble modern elephants. Native to North America, they are said to have lived on the continent from almost 4 million years ago until their eventual disappearance about 10,000 years ago. In 1900, archaeologist James K. Hampson documented the find of skeletal remains of a mastodon on Island No. 35 of the Mississippi River, 2 miles (3.2 km) south of the Nodena Site and 23 miles (37 km) south of Blytheville, Arkansas. In 1957 the site was reported as destroyed.

== See also ==
- Eaker Site
- Mississippian culture
- Southeastern Ceremonial Complex
- List of Mississippian sites
- List of sites and peoples visited by the Hernando de Soto Expedition
- List of burial mounds in the United States
