= Wilson, Arkansas =

City in Arkansas known for its cotton production

- City
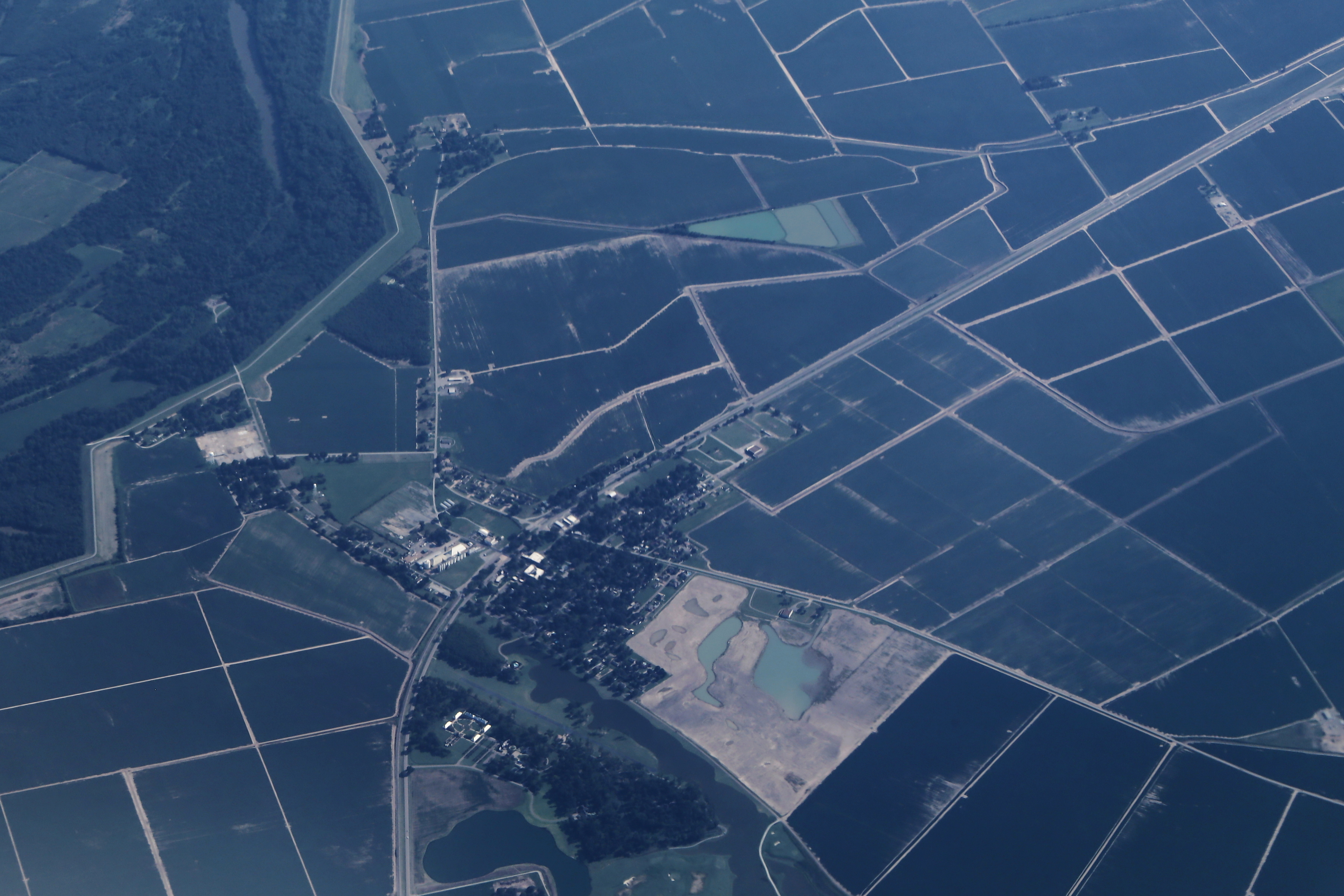
- Aerial image of Wilson

- Location in Mississippi County, Arkansas
- Coordinates: 35°33′58″N 90°02′35″W
- Country: United States
- State: Arkansas
- County: Mississippi
- Incorporated: March 19, 1959

Area
  - Total: 1.05 sq mi (2.73 km^{2})
  - Land: 1.05 sq mi (2.71 km^{2})
  - Water: 0.0077 sq mi (0.02 km^{2})
- Elevation: 236 ft (72 m)

Population (2020)
  - Total: 766
  - Estimate (2025): 702 ▼
  - Density: 731.5/sq mi (282.44/km^{2})
- Time zone: UTC−06:00 (Central (CST))
  - Summer (DST): UTC−05:00 (CDT)
- ZIP Code: 72395
- Area code: 870
- FIPS code: 05-75920
- GNIS feature ID: 2405757

Wilson is a city in Mississippi County, Arkansas, United States. The community is located in the Arkansas Delta and is surrounded by fertile cropland historically used to produce cotton. Wilson started as a company town in 1886 by Robert E. Lee Wilson, who would build a cotton empire and run it from the city. The Wilson Company would become so successful that all of the town's buildings were rebuilt in the Tudor Revival architectural style following Wilson's son's honeymoon to England in 1925. Wilson incorporated in 1959, becoming a town with public roads and municipal government. The extensive property holdings of the Lee Wilson and Company remained in the Wilson family until 2010. The community has seen a rapid decline in economic activity and population since the advent of mechanization on the farm, reducing the need for manual labor to produce cotton. The population was 766 at the 2020 census, down from 903 at the 2010 census.

== History ==
The area was first known as Crowell's Landing, but mostly washed away in the 1880s. Steamboat agent Dr. J.W. Rhodes purchased 37 acres in 1883 and founded a new landing on the Mississippi River he named Golden Lake. Soon after he was named postmaster.

The city of Wilson was started about a mile and half north as a company town for Robert E. Lee Wilson's nearby logging and sawmill operation founded in 1886. The village prospered when Wilson decided to use the cleared land for agriculture instead of selling it after logging. In 1900, a major archaeological find occurred near Wilson when James K. Hampson discovered the Island 35 Mastodon. All residents of Wilson except the postmaster and railroad employees had access to company doctors for $1.25 annually ($24.09 in 2025 dollars), a rarity in the poverty-stricken Arkansas delta. The company also employed people to work in Wilson's basic service industries, such as drycleaning and automobile repair, keeping the standard of living high.

In the early 1900's, R.L. Wilson began construction on a railroad to connect the town with Golden Landing and his sawmill operations in the area. This line was bought out by the Jonesboro, Lake City and Eastern Railroad in 1912.

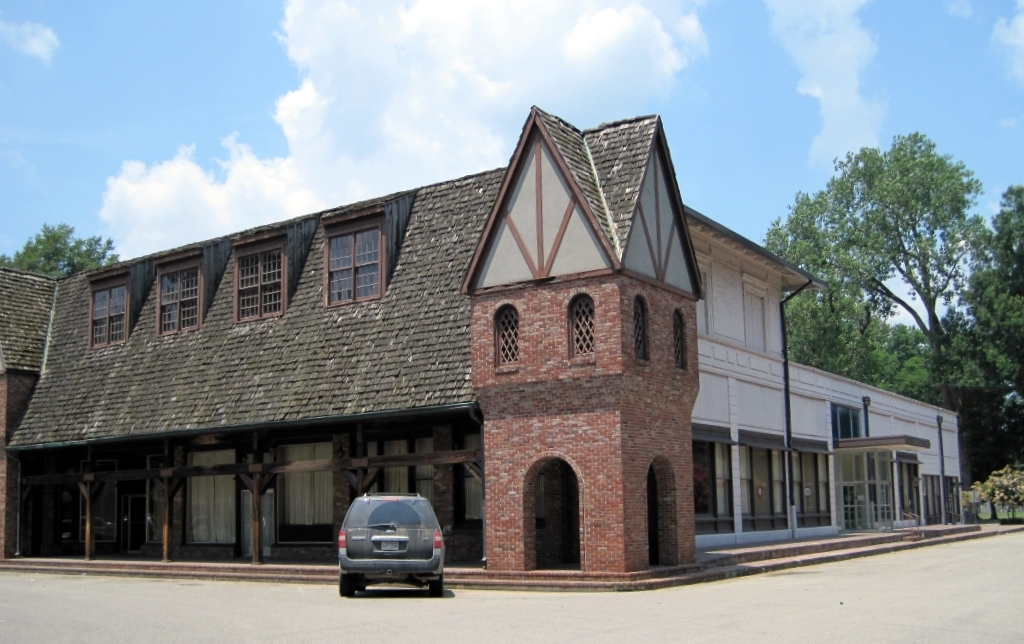
Downtown Wilson

After Wilson's son, Wilson Jr., and his wife returned from their England honeymoon enthralled with the Tudor style in 1925, all subsequent public buildings were built with Tudor architecture, including retrofits to all existing public structures. The town incorporated in 1959, selling the houses to the renters living in them and gaining access to tax income it was previously excluded from as a company entity. As technology advanced on the farm, fewer employees were needed and many moved from Wilson to seek other employment.

On January 27, 1921, the lynching of Henry Lowry happened near Wilson; some 500 people participated in the burning of a black sharecropper.

== Geography ==
Wilson is in southern Mississippi County, in the Arkansas Delta region of the state. The area is dominated by the Mississippi River flood plains, trees and fields. Along and parallel to the Tennessee–Arkansas state line, the former course of the Mississippi River as it was before the 1811–12 New Madrid earthquakes is still visible in the landscape more than 200 years after the events. The former riverbed has shrunk to small side arms of the Mississippi which, dependent on the water level and precipitation, are still partly connected to the river. According to the United States Census Bureau, the town has a total area of 1.05 square miles (2.72 km^{2}), all land.

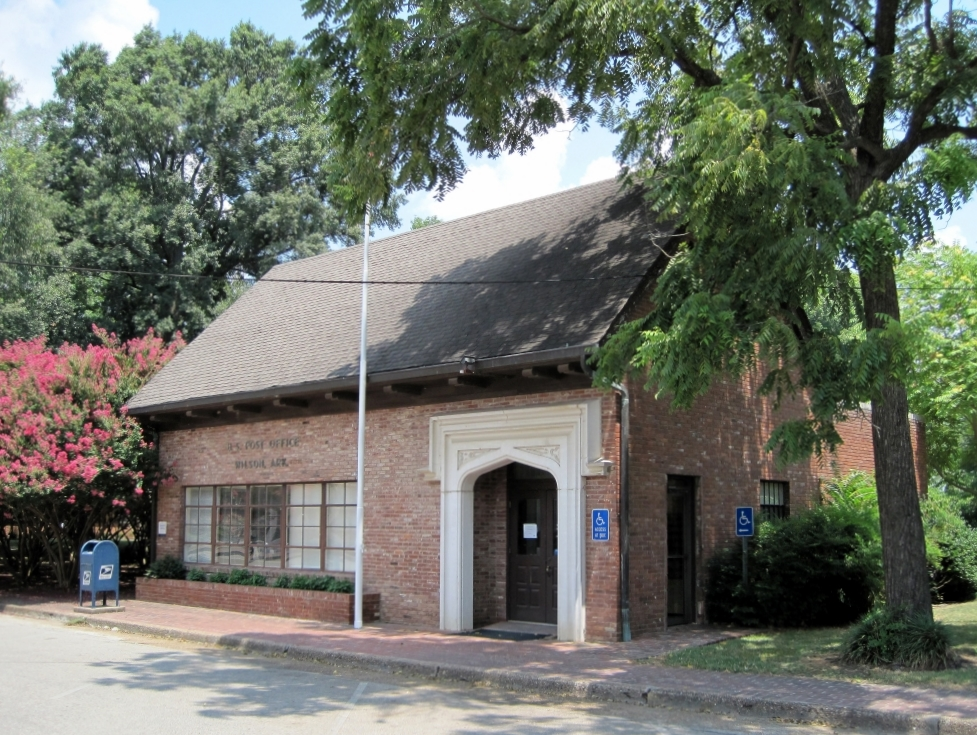
Tudor-inspired post office, 2010

The town is located at the intersection of U.S. Route 61 (US 61) and Arkansas Highway 14. The segment of US 61 through Wilson has been designated as part of the Great River Road, a tourist route to display the heritage of communities along the Mississippi River. Highway 61 leads north 11 miles (18 km) to Osceola, the Mississippi county seat, and southwest 19 miles (31 km) to Turrell.

== Demographics ==
Historical population
Census	Pop.	Note	%±
1960	1,191		—
1970	1,009		−15.3%
1980	1,115		10.5%
1990	1,068		−4.2%
2000	939		−12.1%
2010	903		−3.8%
2020	766		−15.2%
2025 (est.)	702	▼	−8.4%
U.S. Decennial Census

=== 2020 census ===
Wilson racial composition
Race	Number	Percentage
White (non-Hispanic)	558	72.85%
Black or African American (non-Hispanic)	163	21.28%
Native American	3	0.39%
Other/Mixed	24	3.13%
Hispanic or Latino	18	2.35%

As of the 2020 United States census, there were 766 people, 355 households, and 267 families residing in the city.

=== 2010 census ===
As of the 2010 United States census, there were 903 people living in the city. The racial makeup of the city was 74.6% White, 21.7% Black, 0.3% Native American, 0.7% Asian, 0.1% from some other race and 1.6% from two or more races. 1.0% were Hispanic or Latino of any race.

=== 2000 census ===
As of the census of 2000, there were 939 people, 364 households, and 264 families living in the town. The population density was 338.8/km^{2} (873.9/mi^{2}). There were 386 housing units at an average density of 139.3/km^{2} (359.3/mi^{2}). At the time of the survey 73.27% of the population was White, 26.30% Black or African American, 0.11% Native American, 0.32% from other races. 0.96% of the population were Hispanic or Latino.

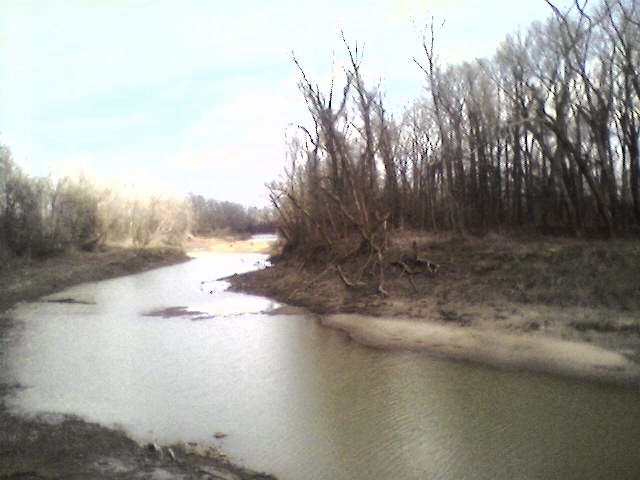
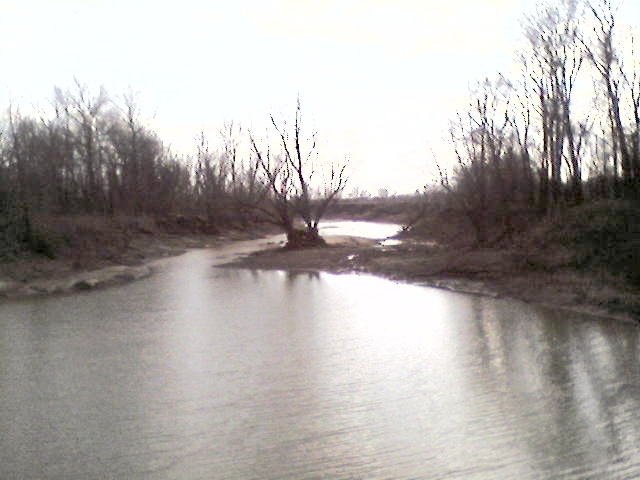
A view to the North and South of the old bed of the Mississippi River before the 1811/1812 earthquakes

There were 364 households, out of which 36.8% had children under the age of 18 living with them, 48.4% were married couples living together, 19.8% had a female householder with no husband present, and 27.2% were non-families. 25.0% of all households were made up of individuals, and 11.3% had someone living alone who was 65 years of age or older. The average household size was 2.58 and the average family size was 3.07.

In the town, the population was spread out, with 28.3% under the age of 18, 8.4% from 18 to 24, 25.5% from 25 to 44, 25.6% from 45 to 64, and 12.2% who were 65 years of age or older. The median age was 37 years. For every 100 females, there were 80.9 males. For every 100 females age 18 and over, there were 79.5 males.

The median income for a household in the town was $33,625, and the median income for a family was $38,971. Males had a median income of $30,526 versus $20,625 for females. The per capita income for the town was $14,738. About 10.7% of families and 11.8% of the population were below the poverty line, including 12.1% of those under age 18 and 20.2% of those age 65 or over.

== Economy ==
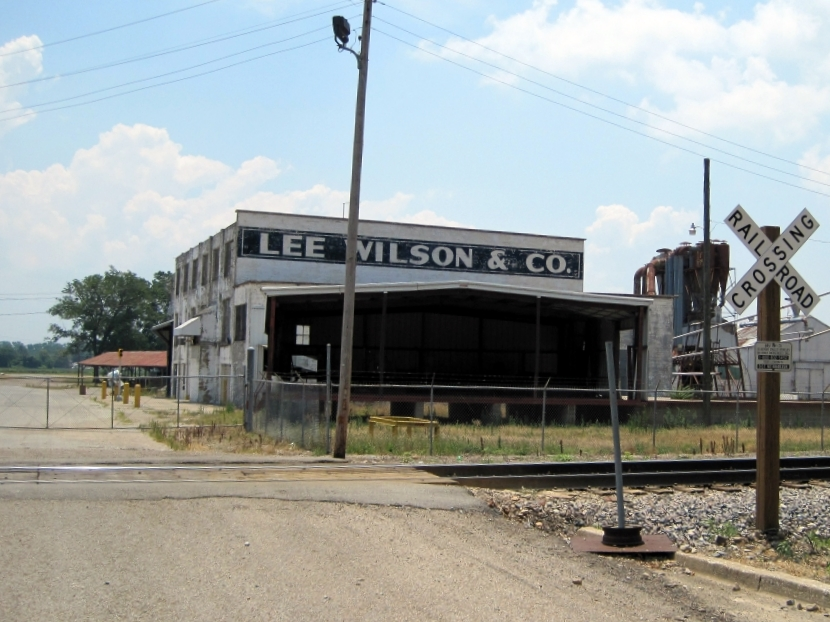
Abandoned Lee Wilson and Company warehouse, 2010

Agriculture is the predominant source of income in the area surrounding Wilson, especially the cultivation of cotton. After the abolition of slavery, sharecropping was the primary means of income for low income families in the area. Mostly for the cultivation of cotton, land would be used by sharecroppers in return for a share of the crop to the landowner. Modern machines like the cotton picker have made manual cultivation obsolete over time as they took over the work from the hand laborers.

=== Tourism ===
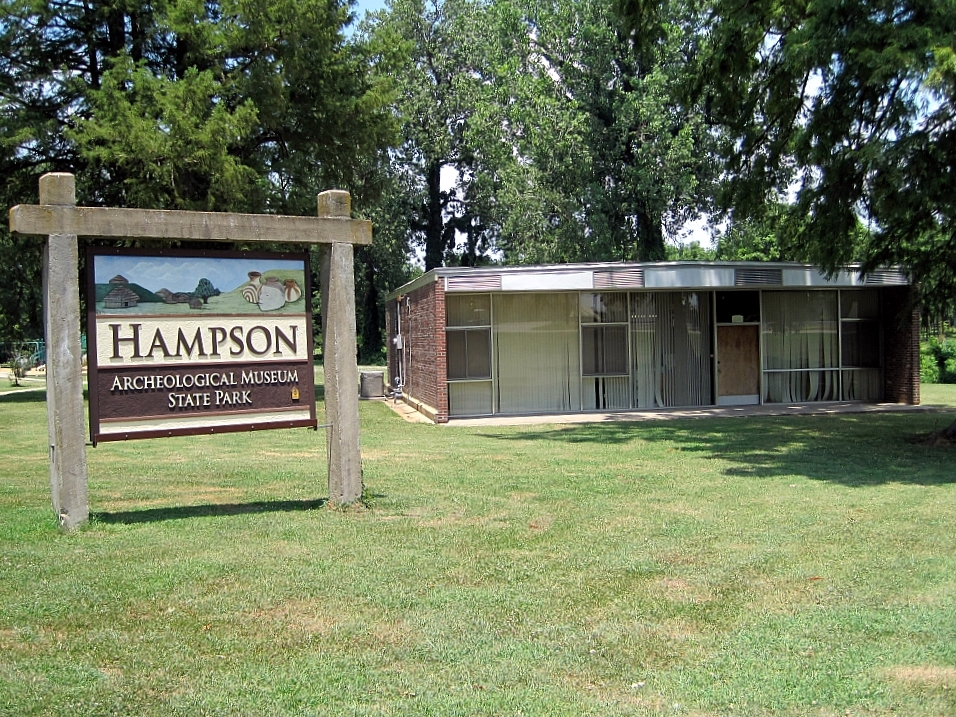
Hampson Museum State Park (2010)

The Hampson Museum State Park in downtown Wilson exhibits an archaeological collection of early American aboriginal artifacts from the Nodena site 5 mi (8 km) east of the town. The museum documents the culture of a civilization which existed in a 15-acre (60,703 m^{2}) palisaded village on a meander bend of the Mississippi River in the area around 1400–1650 CE. Cultivation of crops, hunting, social life, religion and politics of that ancient civilization are topics of the exhibition.

In 1964, the Nodena site was declared a National Historic Landmark and was added to the National Register of Historic Places two years later.

== Education ==
Public education for elementary and secondary school students is available from the Wilson-based Rivercrest School District (formerly Southern Mississippi County School District), which leads to graduation from Rivercrest High School.

The Wilson school district merged into the South Mississippi district in 1968.

== See also ==
- Armorel, Arkansas: company town founded by R.E.L. Wilson
- Marie, Arkansas: company town founded by R.E.L. Wilson
- Victoria, Arkansas: company town founded by R.E.L. Wilson
