= Hampson Archeological Museum State Park =

State park in Arkansas, United States

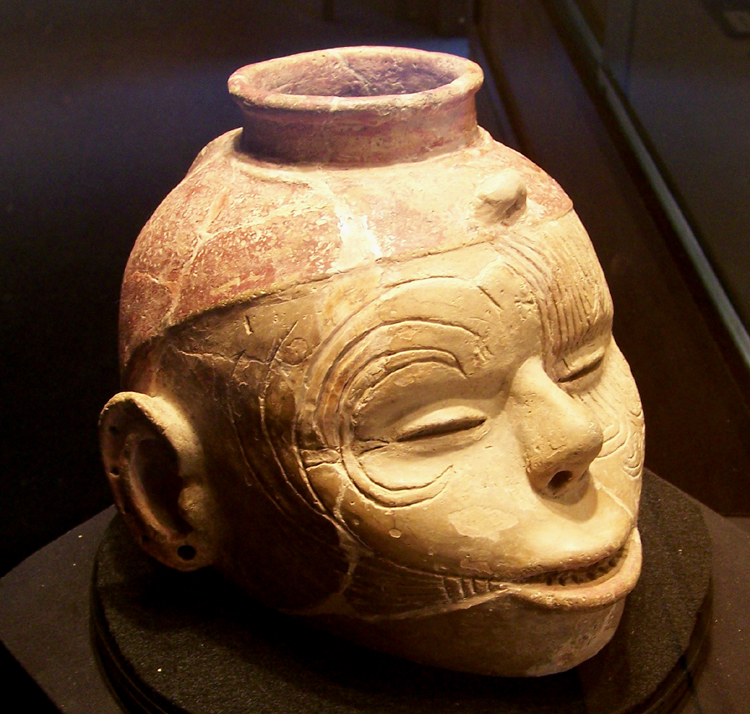
- A human head effigy pot on display at the museum

- Location within Arkansas Location within the United States
- Interactive map of Hampson Archeological Museum; State Park
- Location: Wilson, Arkansas, United States
- Coordinates: 35°34′13″N 90°02′25″W
- Area: 5 acres (2.0 ha)
- Established: 1961
- Administrator: Arkansas Department of Parks and Tourism
- Named for: James K. Hampson
- Website: Official website
- Arkansas State Parks

Hampson Archeological Museum State Park is a 5-acre (2.0 ha) Arkansas state park in Mississippi County, Arkansas in the United States. The museum contains a collection of archeological artifacts from the Nodena site, which is a former Native American village on the Mississippi River between 1400 and 1650. James K. Hampson began excavating the site in the 1920s, a museum was built in 1946 and the Arkansas General Assembly officially accepted the collection of artifacts from the Hampson family on March 30, 1957. The park first opened in 1961 as Hampson Museum State Park and has since been renamed.

Around 1400-1650 CE an aboriginal palisaded village existed in the Nodena area on a meander bend of the Mississippi River. Artifacts from this site are on display in the Hampson Museum State Park.

The museum is named after James K. Hampson, a local landowner and archaeologist.

== Nodena village: 1400-1650 CE ==
About 5 mi (8 km) east of Wilson, at the Nodena site, archeological artifacts from an aboriginal village of the Nodena people dated 1400-1650 CE were found in the first half of the 20th century.

A collection of these artifacts is on display at the Hampson Museum State Park. The museum documents the culture of the civilization of the Nodena people, who lived in a 15-acre (6.1 ha) palisaded village on a horseshoe bend of the Mississippi River in the Wilson, Arkansas area. Cultivation of crops, hunting, social life, religion and politics of that ancient civilization are topics of the exhibition.

In 1964 the Nodena site was declared a National Historic Landmark. In 1966 it was added to the National Register of Historic Places.

The Parkin Indian Mound is the site of another Indian village contemporary with the Nodena people, located in Parkin, Arkansas, about 30 mi (50 km) southwest of Wilson.

== James K. Hampson ==
The museum is named after James K. Hampson (1877-1956), owner of the Hampson Plantation on which the Nodena site is located, and archaeologist to excavate and preserve the artifacts from the Nodena site.

In 1900 James K. Hampson documented the discovery of a prehistoric mastodon skeleton 2 mi (3.2 km) south of the Nodena site.

=== Prehistoric Mastodon skeleton ===
Mastodons are members of the prehistoric, extinct genus Mammut, they resemble modern elephants. Native to North America they are said to have lived on the North American continent from almost 4 million years ago until their eventual disappearance about 10,000 years ago.

In 1900, archaeologist James K. Hampson documented the find of skeletal remains of a mastodon on Island No. 35 of the Mississippi River, 2 mi (3.2 km) south of the Nodena site and 23 mi (37 km) south of Blytheville, Arkansas.

In 1957 the site was reported as destroyed. Fossilized bones from the find are on display at the Hampson Museum State Park.

== See also ==
- Wilson, Arkansas
- Reverie, Tennessee
- Parkin Archeological State Park
