= James K. Hampson =

American archaeologist

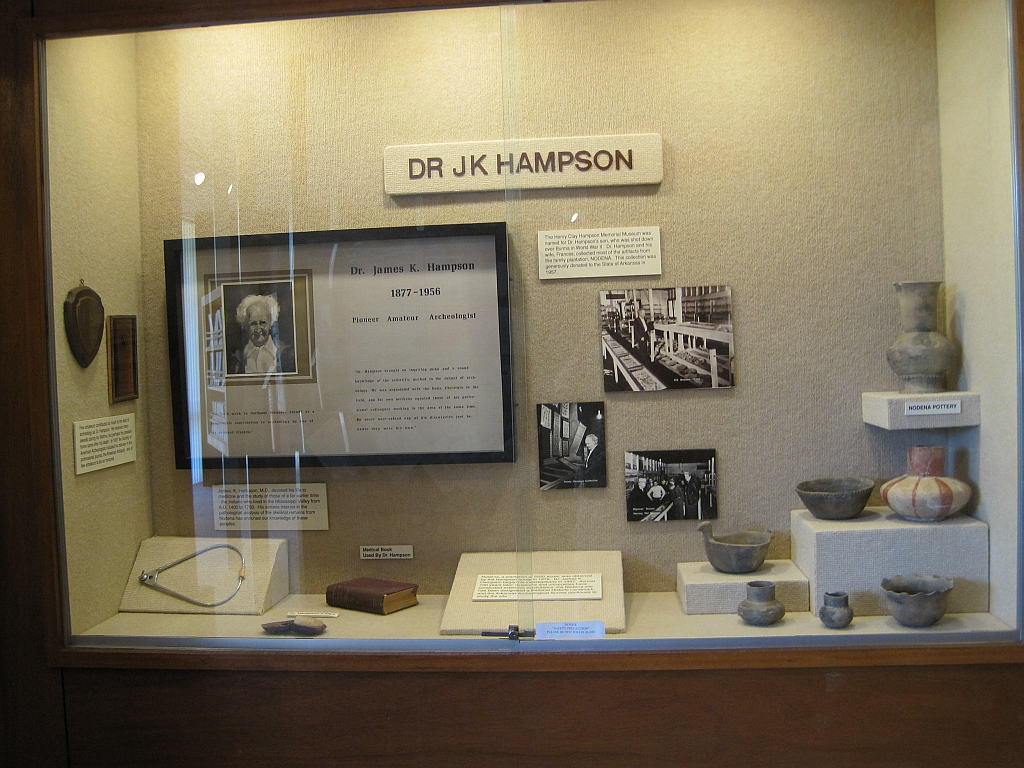
James K. Hampson exhibit at the Hampson Museum State Park

James Kelly Hampson (1877 – 8 October 1956) was an American archaeologist. He excavated and preserved the artifacts from the Nodena site, and was owner of the Hampson Plantation in Wilson, Arkansas.

The Hampson Museum State Park in Wilson, Arkansas is named after James K. Hampson. The museum exhibits an archeological collection of early American aboriginal artifacts from the Nodena site.

In 1900 Hampson documented the discovery of a prehistoric mastodon skeleton 2 miles (3.2 km) south of the Nodena site.

== Nodena village ==
At the Nodena site, archeological artifacts from a 15-acre (6.1 ha) aboriginal village dated 1400–1650 CE were discovered by Hampson in the first half of the 20th century. The village was located about 5 miles (8.0 km) east of Wilson, Arkansas, and 4 miles (6.4 km) northeast of Reverie, Tennessee.

In 1964 the Nodena site was declared a National Historic Landmark. In 1966 it was added to the National Register of Historic Places.

== Hampson Museum State Park ==
The Hampson Museum State Park exhibits an archeological collection of early American aboriginal artifacts from the Nodena site.

The museum documents the culture of a civilization which existed in a 15-acre (60,703 m^{2}) palisaded village on a meander bend of the Mississippi River in the Wilson, Arkansas area around 1400–1650 CE. Cultivation of crops, hunting, social life, religion and politics of that ancient civilization are topics of the exhibition.

== Prehistoric mastodon skeleton ==
Mastodons are members of the prehistoric, extinct genus Mammut, they resemble modern elephants. Native to North America they are said to have lived on the North American continent from almost 4 million years ago until their eventual disappearance about 10,000 years ago.

In 1900 Hampson documented the find of skeletal remains of a mastodon on Island No. 35 of the Mississippi River, 2 miles (3.2 km) south of the Nodena site and 23 miles (37 km) south of Blytheville, Arkansas. In 1957 the site was reported as destroyed.
