= Chucalissa =

- Chucalissa Site
- U.S. National Register of Historic Places
- U.S. National Historic Landmark
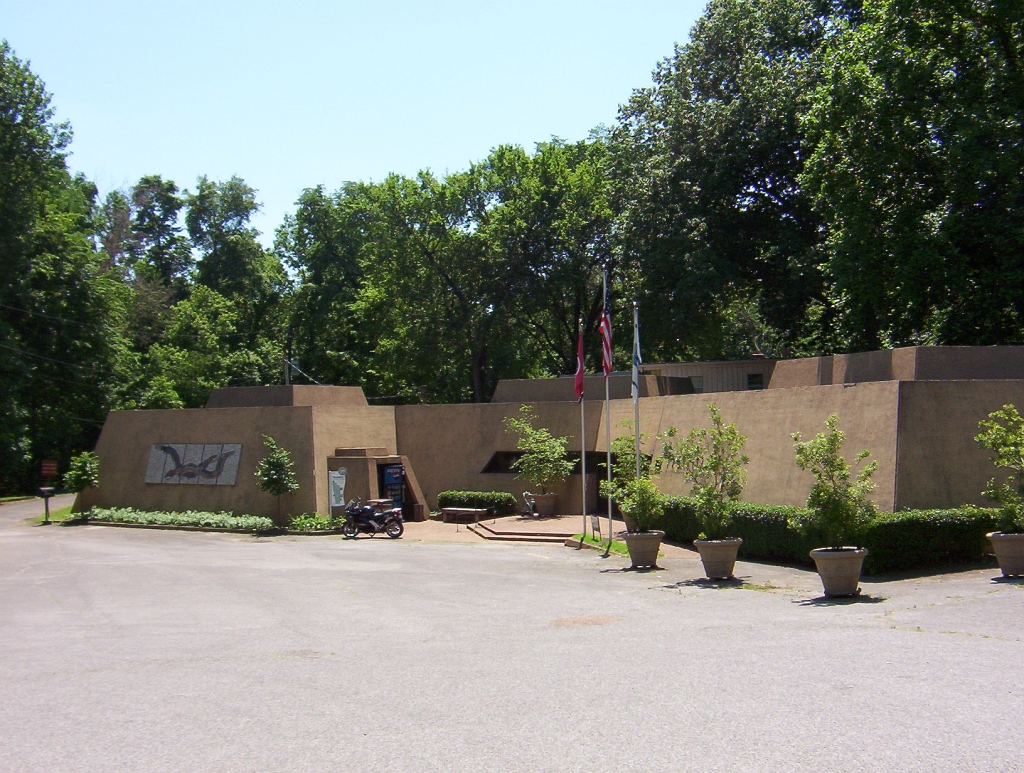
- C.H. Nash Museum at Chucalissa (2009)

- Location within Tennessee Location within the United States
- Location: 1987 Indian Village Drive, Memphis, Tennessee
- Coordinates: 35°3′45″N 90°7′44″W
- Area: 160 acres (65 ha)
- NRHP reference No.: 73001830

Significant dates
- Added to NRHP: May 7, 1973
- Designated NHL: April 19, 1994

The C.H. Nash Museum at Chucalissa is located on and exhibits excavated materials of the Mississippian culture archaeological site known as Chucalissa (40 SY 1) which means "abandoned house" in Chickasaw. The site is located adjacent to the T. O. Fuller State Park within the city of Memphis, Tennessee, United States. Chucalissa was designated National Historic Landmark in 1994 due to its importance as one of the best-preserved and major prehistoric settlement sites in the region.

== Description ==
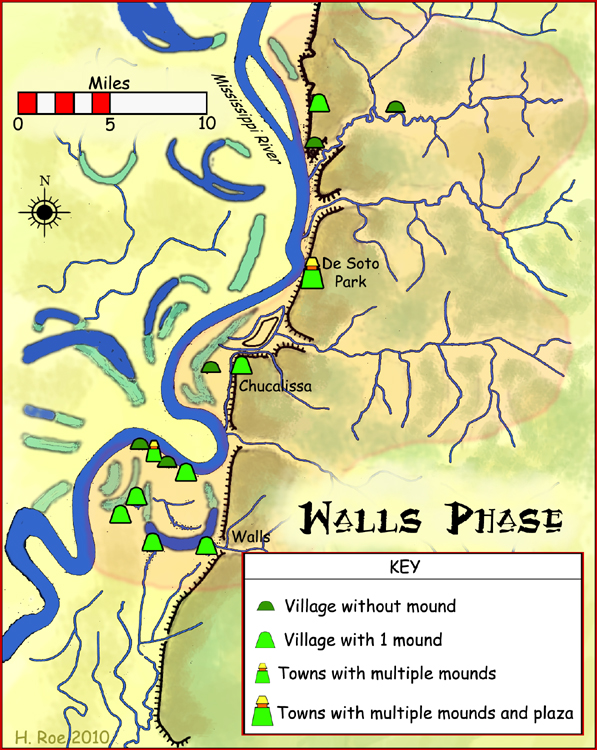
The Walls phase and some of its associated sites

Chucalissa is a Walls phase mound and plaza complex that was occupied, abandoned and reoccupied several times throughout its history, spanning from 1000 to 1550 CE. It is located on a bluff overlooking the Mississippi River. Other contemporaneous groups in the area include the Parkin phase, Menard phase, and the Nodena phase. It is known for the well preserved architectural, floral, faunal, and human osteological remains excavated there. During the early 1540s the Hernando de Soto Expedition passed through the area, stopping at many villages along the way. It is thought that the Walls phase may be the Province of Quizquiz encountered by de Soto on the banks of the Mississippi River. There is no evidence that Chucalissa itself was visited by the expedition, as it is thought to have been abandoned at the time.

== C. H. Nash Museum at Chucalissa ==
Civilian Conservation Corps workers discovered Native American artifacts on the site in 1938 and archaeological excavations of this Mississippian mound complex were initiated. The C. H. Nash Museum at Chucalissa and the rest of the village grounds have been operated by the University of Memphis since 1962.

In 1973 Chucalissa Indian Village was added to the National Register of Historic Places. Later, in 1994, it was declared a National Historic Landmark. The archaeological site and grounds are managed by the C. H. Nash Museum at Chucalissa staff and students. The museum, named after its founding director, curates an extensive collection of artifacts recovered during a 40-year period of systematic excavations. The site features a Mississippian mound complex, nature trail and arboretum, hands-on archaeology lab, and exhibits that explore the history and life-ways of Native Americans of the historic and prehistoric southeastern United States.

== See also ==
- Mississippian culture
- Parkin Archeological State Park
- Nodena site
- List of museums in Tennessee
- List of National Historic Landmarks in Tennessee
- National Register of Historic Places listings in Shelby County, Tennessee
