= Mississippian culture pottery =

Ceramics of the Mississippian culture (800 to 1600 CE)

Mississippian culture pottery is the ceramic tradition of the Mississippian culture (800 to 1600 CE) found as artifacts in archaeological sites in the American Midwest and Southeast. It is often characterized by the adoption and use of riverine (or more rarely marine) shell-tempering agents in the clay paste. Shell tempering is one of the hallmarks of Mississippian cultural practices. Analysis of local differences in materials, techniques, forms, and designs is a primary means for archaeologists to learn about the lifeways, religious practices, trade, and interaction among Mississippian peoples. The value of this pottery on the illegal antiquities market has led to extensive looting of sites.

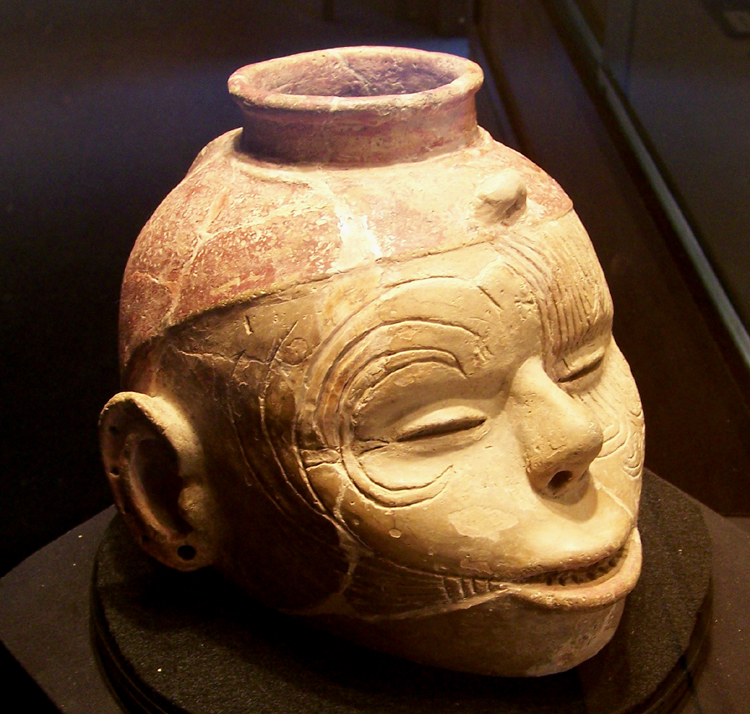
A human head effigy pot from the Nodena site

== Materials and techniques ==
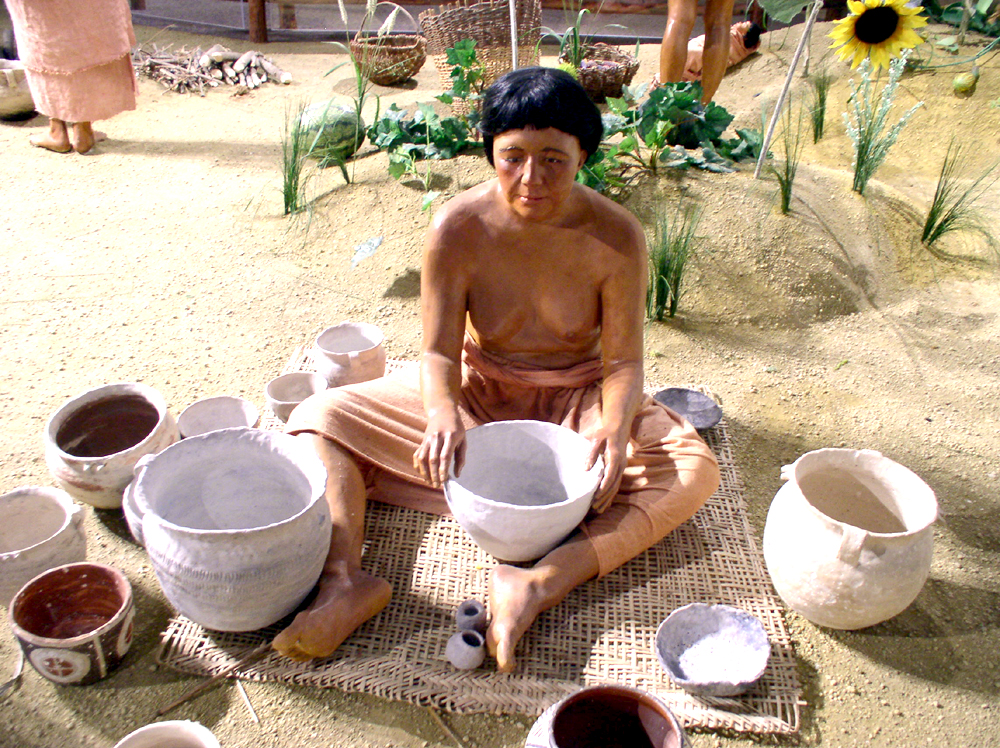
A diorama of a Mississippian culture potter from the Angel Mounds site museum

Mississippian culture pottery was made from locally available clay sources, which often gives archaeologists clues as to where a specific example originated. The clay was tempered with an additive to keep it from shrinking and cracking in the drying and firing process, usually with ground mussel shells. In some locations the older tradition of grog tempering (use of crushed-up potsherds) persisted into Mississippian times.

The potters used slab-built construction and the "coiling" method, which involved working the clay into a long string which was wound round to form a shape and then modeled to form smooth walls. The potter's wheel was not used by pre-contact Native Americans. Some decoration of the clay was done at this stage by incising, defenstrating, adding shapes, or stamping designs into the wet clay. After the piece had dried completely, it was fired in a wood fire.

Most pottery found at Mississippian sites is of the variety known as "Mississippian Bell Plain." It is buff colored, contains large fragments of ground mussel shell as a tempering agent, and is not as smooth and polished as finer varieties. Higher quality ceramics feature a finer ground shell as a temper – some instances being so finely ground as to look untempered. Extravagant fine serving wares and grave goods were also produced, with some examples exhibiting handles shaped like animal heads and tails, or in the shapes of animal or human forms. Women were probably the makers of pottery, as they were in most other Native American cultures. Archaeologists found 11 polishing pebbles and a mushroom-shaped pottery anvil in the grave of a woman at the Nodena site.

Both amateur collectors as well as professional archeologists have long known that shell-tempered pottery is characteristic of the middle and lower Mississippi Valley. "Grave diggers" and amateur collectors have plundered many Mississippian mounds for the fine funerary effigies and other vessels placed as grave goods within mounds and surrounding village areas. Early professional surveys in the valley noted the preponderance of shell-tempered wares in large village sites throughout the valley alluvial plains.

Mississippian pottery is easily distinguished from earlier Woodland period pottery. Woodland vessels tend to have thicker walls, flat or conical bases and a large amount of either coarse sand or grog used as temper. Mississippian vessels generally have thinner vessel walls, obvious white flecks of shell temper, and round-bottomed pottery forms. For decades archeologists have examined, sorted, described and stored Woodland sherds from those of Mississippian vessels with relative ease.

=== Shell tempering ===
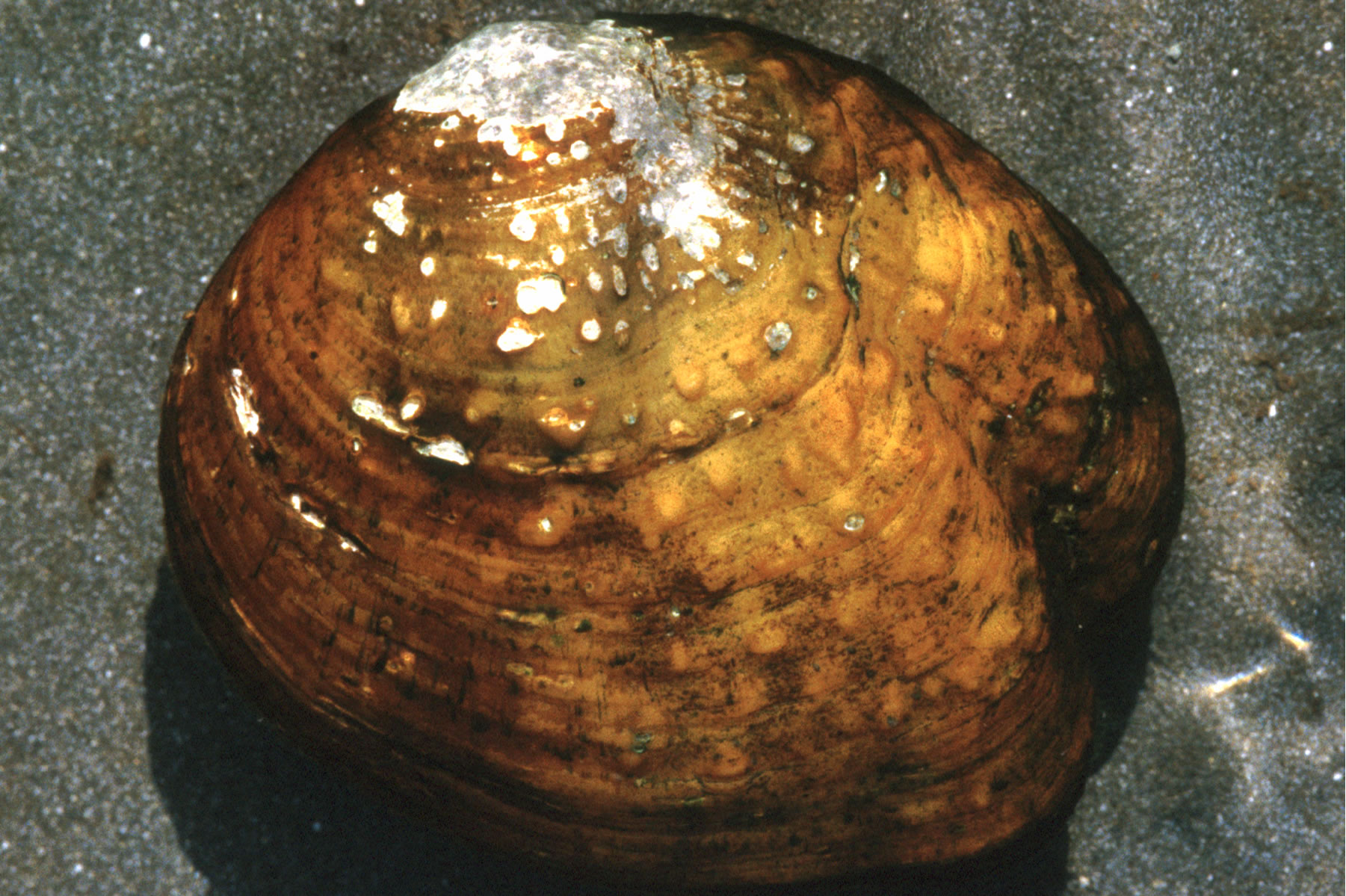
A Quadrula intermedia, a species of freshwater mussel, endemic to the US

Shell tempering is a diagnostic criterion in the identification of Mississippian cultures and their ceramic artifacts, excavated site strata, and archeological site surveys in general. The record indicates that around 800 CE, early populations of Mississippian peoples produced shell-tempered pottery in the Central Mississippi Valley at sites, such as the Fairmont Phase at Cahokia and the Early Mississippian strata excavated at the Zebree Site (3MS20) at Big Lake in northeastern Arkansas.

In the early 1970s, archeologists working in Northeast Arkansas for the Arkansas Archeological Survey began research into causes of Mississippi Valley potters' relatively sudden shift to shell temper. The team conducted research at the AAS Station Lab at Arkansas State University involving macroscopic, microscopic, petrographic thin-sections, atomic absorption and x-ray diffraction analyses.

A member of the team, Michael G. Million, also conducted replicative experiments, perhaps the first person to do so with the exact clays, tempers and tools used by prehistoric Mississippian potters. Pastes were created using a variety of temper-to-clay percentages so that vessels as well as test-tiles could be produced for examination. Test tiles gave information about the shrinkage rates of various clay/temper combinations to the 'green' state and yielded further information upon firing. Simple, round-bottom cooking jars were built using coil construction and the Mississippian pottery tool set, including a pottery anvil, wooden paddle, mussel shell scrapers and polishing stones.

The research discovered that there were very good reasons for using shell tempering for Mississippi Valley clays. The nature of clays formed by such a large meandering river system are distinctive. The huge annually flooded backswamp areas create a clay that is composed of very minute clay particles (primarily silica) and a high proportion of organic content. This is caused by the slow settling or deposition of the alluvial materials after floods. The clay particles tend to measure just a few micrometres in size and in plate-like form. Large amounts of water can be tightly held in the interspace between the clay particles. Add to this the organic ooze, and one has what is known colloquially as "gumbo" clay.

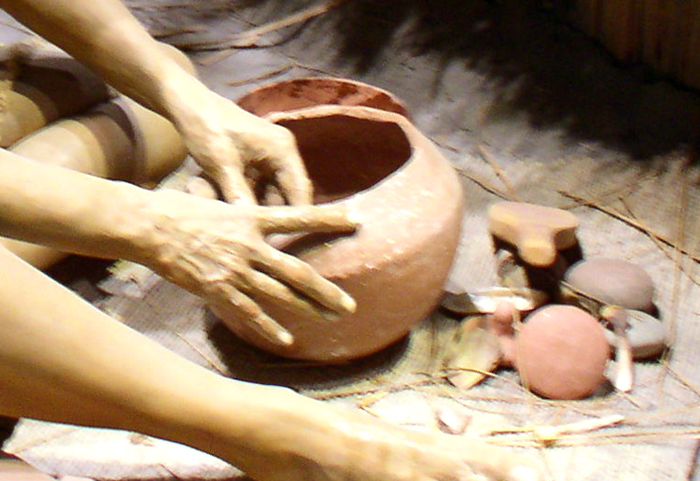
A potter smooths the inside of a vessel

Such clay has a high "shrink-swell" ratio depending upon the amount of water present. As it dries from a saturated to a dry state, it shrinks greatly – as seen in the cracked clay deposits of drying flooded areas – and this characteristic presents a serious problem to the potter. As the vessel is fired, any water left in the clay will tend to quickly turn to steam and explode the vessel wall in a spawl. It takes care and time to dry these vessels before they can be fired safely. Moreover, as even a well-tempered vessel dries, shrinkage rates vary around the contours of the form and will create strains that will crack an air-drying vessel if the drying is not slowed and controlled. A high shrinkage rate probably meant much effort lost to broken pots in both the drying and firing stages for inexperienced potters and ineffective technologies. Woodland potters attempted to remedy the high shrinkage by using large amounts (up to 33%) of coarse sand and/or grog temper in their efforts to render the clay usable for vessel construction. Moreover, their vessel shapes were necessarily confined to either a flat or conical-bottomed vessel. A thick-walled construction was required in order for the vessel to stand, in an unfired state, without collapsing during the air-drying process in preparation for firing. Non-backswamp clays used in many parts of the world could use grog and/or sand and create a round-bottomed vessel, favored by the cook, but not so with the "gumbo" clays of the Mississippi Valley.

Another and perhaps even more immediate challenge to the potter using the available backswamp clay is its extreme stickiness, which is called plasticity in ceramic terminology. All but the coarsest of clays are somewhat plastic and malleable in the presence of water; however, the minute, clay plate-like particles of backswamp clay are so small that they are influenced by the ionic charges at their edges. The collective ionic charge acts to cause the clay plates to repel each other and thus slip and slide against each other. The shell particles, also plate-like, were produced by the Mississippian potter by collecting then burning freshwater mussel shells, which were originally most likely a byproduct of harvesting the meat for food.

The x-ray diffraction of a sample from an unfired lump of pottery clay excavated at the Zebree (3MS20) site confirmed that the shell was burned before being added to the raw clay. Burning the shells eliminates the organic binder and the cooled, burnt shells are easily crushed into a shell temper of fine plate-like particles, some nearly powder. The hinges of the shells are discarded. Using burned shells is logical as unburned mussel shells are hard and very durable. In terms of soil technology, the addition of shell (calcium carbonate) has the effect of neutralizing the ionic charge of the clay particles. During the course of replicative pottery experiments, as the shell was added to the clay in the presence of water, distinct and immediate changes took place in the feel of the clay. With the valence neutral, the clay-temper combination produces a very satisfactory pottery clay. This modification of backswamp clay – particles now clumping instead of constantly slipping – into a well-behaved modeling clay would have been immediately noticed by the experienced prehistoric potter.

Adding as little as 10–15% shell temper created an excellent pottery paste that was lighter, stronger and more able to withstand the drying process, and the clay's originally high plasticity was subdued. The calcium carbonate of the freshwater mussels also acts as a binding agent and created a stronger vessel. Thinner coils to make thinner walled vessel were a natural consequence. As the potter was probably also the cook, she was now able to construct a more effective cooking pot. Thinner walls allowed heat to transfer to the food more effectively. A round vessel bottom allows easy stirring of the contents, a more even dissipation of the cooking heat and also permits a more even dispersion of the shock of impacts reducing breakage.

The benefits of shell-tempered pottery vessels to the Mississippian household were much more efficient utility containers for cooking, particularly the increasing amounts of maize being grown in the valley, and thus sustaining larger and healthier populations in evidence in the archeological record. Around 800 CE, shell-tempered pottery spread widely and rapidly from the middle Mississippi River valley to become an integral part of the expanding Mississippian culture and its improved set of technologies for horticulture, hunting and crafting. The bow and arrow, improved corn domestication and shell-tempered pottery wares were major technical advances which, along with widespread trade, contributed to the formation of the advanced chiefdom societies populating the Eastern United States. These interacting chiefdoms were observed by the earliest of European contacts during the mid-16th century.

=== Incised and engraved decoration ===
Many Mississippian ceramics are decorated by incising or engraving. Implements such as sticks, reeds, or bone fragments, were dragged through wet clay to incise it, or they were scratched into the surface of the dried but as yet unfired pieces to engrave. Sharpened reeds or fingernails were also used to punch small marks. Ornate designs and motifs are common decorative elements, which archaeologists use to track the spread of influences from one culture onto another culture. Many of the designs have symbolic meanings, usually associated with aspects of the Southeastern Ceremonial Complex.

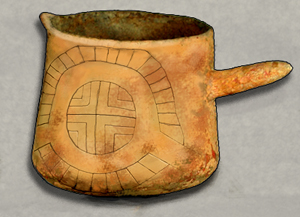
Ceramic beaker from Cahokia with engraved woodhenge motif

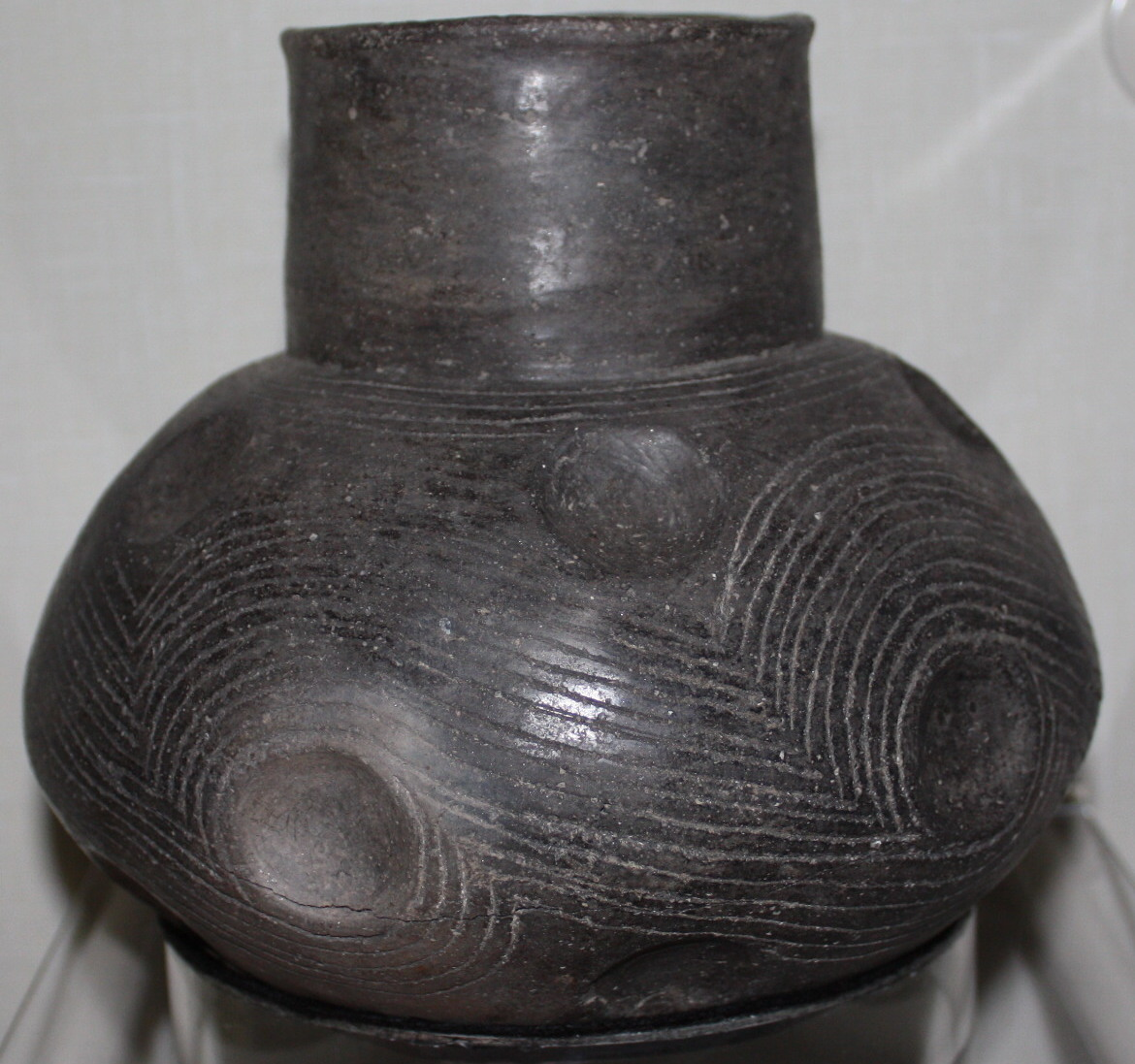
Engraved vessel from the Moundville site in Alabama

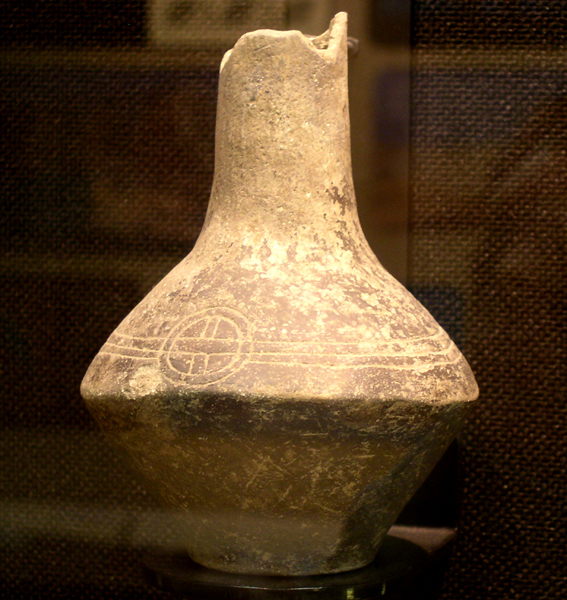
Engraved beaker from the Parkin site in Arkansas

=== Painted decoration ===
Slips using such materials as kaolinite for white, hematite for red, and sometimes graphite for black were used to paint the pottery, with red and white spirals, fylfots, and stripped bottles being particularly popular at sites in the Central Mississippi valley. Widely available ochre produced red, orange, and brown slips. Vegetal pigments included roots, barks, and berries. A technique of "negative painting" involved painting the background after the initial firing and allowing the natural buff or grey of the clay to create the positive image. A clay slip would be used as a resist to define the image, and it would be wiped off after a low smouldering fire. Sometimes paint was worked into incised lines. Hematite could be heated to increase its spectrum from warm red to deep violet.

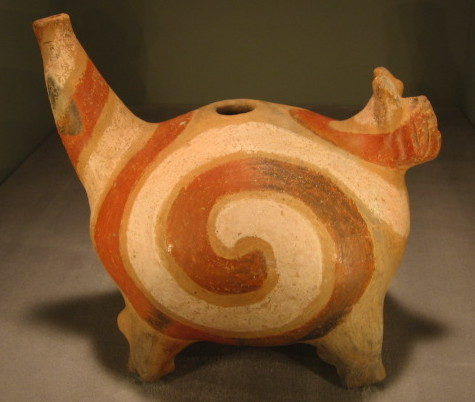
Painted Underwater panther effigy bottle from Cross County, Arkansas

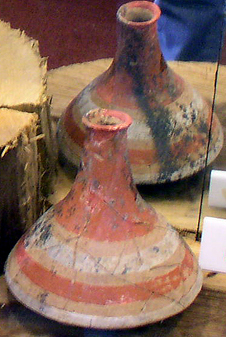
Polychrome painted beakers from the Moundville site in Alabama

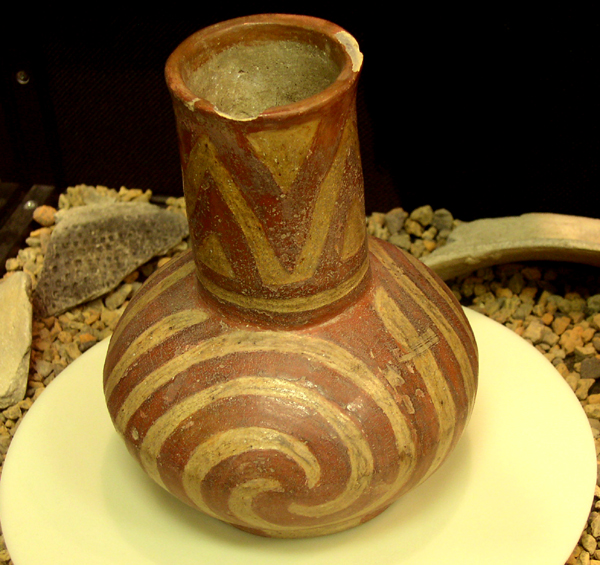
Red and white painted beaker from the Parkin site in Arkansas

=== Textile impressed ceramics ===
Some Mississippian culture pottery was decorated with textile imprints on them. Vegetal cordage or netting was impressed sometimes over the entire external surface of a vessel. Some archaeologists theorize that the textiles used for the imprints were older fabrics that were past their use as garments. Corncobs were also used to create texture on pots.

== Forms ==
Mississippian ceramics took many forms, from earplugs, beads, smoking pipes, discs, to cooking pots, serving dishes, bottles or ollas for liquids, figurative sculpture, and uniquely Mississippian forms such as head pots or hooded vessels. Funeral urns were either crafted specifically to hold human remains or were large utilitarian jars fitted with elaborately decorated lids.

The most ubiquitous form of Mississippian pottery is the "standard Mississippi jar," or a globular jar with a recurved rim and subtle should. In the Pensacola culture of Florida, broken potsherds were rounded off and reused as discoidal game pieces.

=== Effigy pots ===
Effigy pots were a mainstay of many Mississippian peoples, although they come in many different varieties. Some come in anthropomorphic shapes, some zoomorphic shapes and others in the shape of mythological creatures associated with the Southeastern Ceremonial Complex.

==== Head pots ====
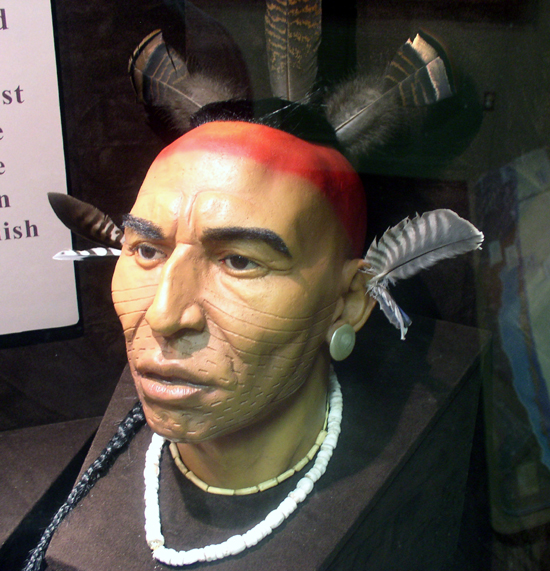
Bust showing how inhabitants of the Parkin site may have looked, based on an effigy pot

Head pots are jars shaped like human heads, typical male, and the figures commonly appear to be deceased. They are typically 3–8 inches tall, with smaller vessels found in the Arkansas River Valley. The polychrome pots feature red, cream, and black slip on buff clay. Most were made between 1200 and 1500 CE in the Central Mississippi Valley area of Arkansas and Missouri. They are considered to be the pinnacle of the Mississippian culture ceramics and are some of the rarest and most unusual clay vessels in North America.

In 1880 an expedition sponsored by the Peabody Museum at an archaeological dig in Cross County, Arkansas found the first reported example. Approximately 200 whole and fragmentary head pots are in private and public collections. Each is unique and it is thought because of the shapes of their eyes and half opened mouths that they are representations of deceased individuals, a death mask of sorts, although it is unclear if they are meant to be the trophy heads of enemies or of their own honored dead. The pots often have painted surfaces, engraved lines representing tattooing and in some cases holes representing ear and nose piercing. Several fine examples are on display at the National Museum of the American Indian in Washington D.C., the Hampson Museum State Park in Wilson, Arkansas, the Parkin Archeological State Park in Parkin, Arkansas and in the University of Arkansas Museum in Fayetteville, Arkansas.

==== Hooded bottles ====
Hooded bottles or vessels were globular containers, resembling gourds, with a rounded base and a smaller "head." One side of the head was shaped like an animal or human face, while the other side was a black, hollow opening. They were slipped on their exterior surface. A theory is that these were used to store seed grain, and unfired clay plugs, such as Kersey Clay Objects, sealed the opening. Another theory is that the bottles were used for liquids. Owls and opossums are often featured on hooded vessels.

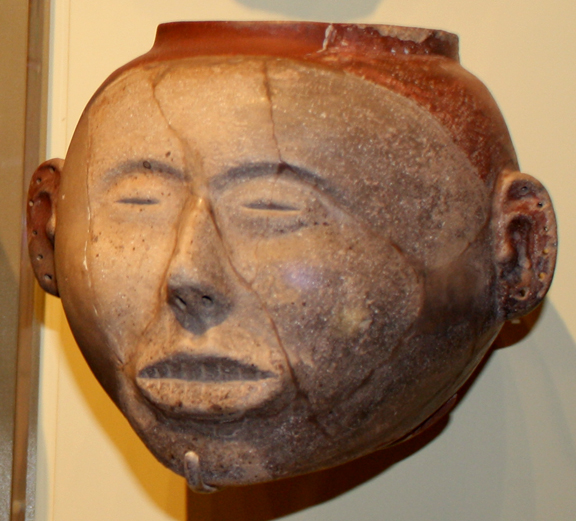
Head pot from Arkansas on display at the National Museum of the American Indian

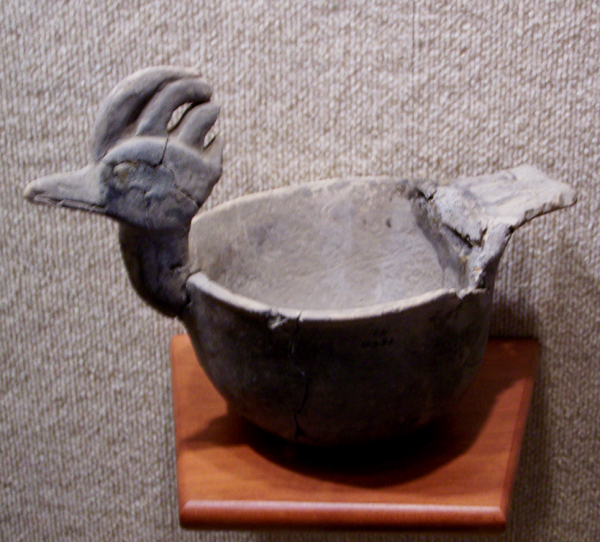
Bird effigy serving dish from the Nodena site in Arkansas

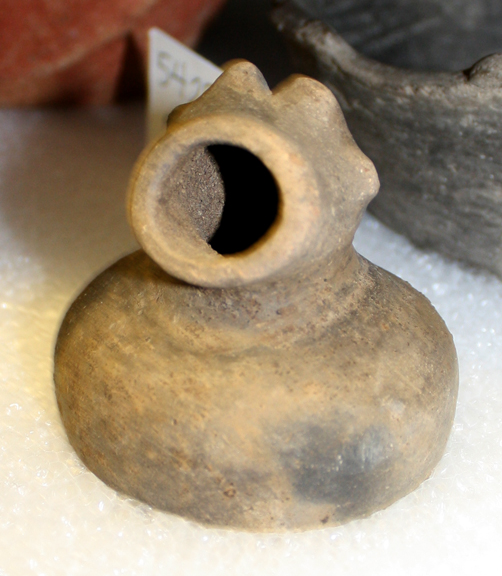
Hooded bottle from Arkansas, collection of the Gilcrease Museum

=== Pipes ===
Ceramic pipes often featured animal effigies. L-shaped elbow pipes were the most common form. A hollow reed or sourwood stem would be inserted into the pipe for smoking.

=== Salt pans ===
Used to process salt, salt pans were large, ovular, shallow clay pans that could hold from 10 to 26 liters. A heavy slip made them more waterproof. They were most likely formed from a mold, possibly a basket. They were lined with grass or textiles to keep from sticking to each other or the mold before firing.

== Notable local traditions ==
=== Cahokian pottery ===
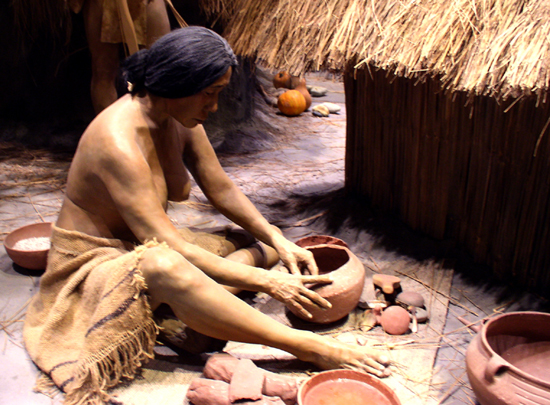
Diorama at Cahokia of a potter at work

Cahokia, the largest pre-Columbian civic center north of Mexico, produced some of the finest and most widely spread ceramics. Pottery from the Cahokia site was especially fine, exhibiting smooth surfaces, very thin walls, and distinctive tempering, slips and coloring. Archaeologists have recorded how these qualities changed and evolved through time, and most examples can be pinpointed very accurately within the phases of the site's chronology. Ramey Incised and Powell Plain are two varieties that emerged during the Stirling Phase, and are considered two of the most important local varieties. A distinctive trait of this period is the shell temper. The cores of the sherds are typically a range of greys to buffs and creams. Some have slips of liquid clay and pigment with common colors being red, grey, and black and the surfaces polished to a high sheen. Although their attributes are nearly identical, there are major differences. While the Powell Plain has an unadorned surface, Ramey Incised are burnished and decorated with a series of incised motifs decorating the upper shoulders of the jar most often interpreted as having underworld or water connections. The incised decoration is added when the clay is still wet by tracing a design with a blunt-ended tool. The specific shapes and incised motifs are used to place the artifacts securely into the local chronology. Most have been found in association with high status items fashioned from exotic materials and associated with specialized structures such as mortuaries and temples, and were almost certainly vessels used exclusively by the elites and for ritual purposes. As the influence of the Cahokian religion, lifestyle and trade network expanded outward from its American Bottom origins, examples of its high status pottery went with it. Numerous examples have been found of local imitations of the exotic wares, albeit usually with less technical skill. Examples of Cahokian made or inspired wares have been found as far away as Aztalan in Wisconsin, the Winterville site in Mississippi and Fort Ancient sites in Ohio.

==== Phases from Cahokia and markers for pottery changes over time ====
Phases	Dates	Markers
Lohmann Phase	1050 - 1100 CE	Most slipped surface ceramics are the shell-tempered light red Monks Mound Red type, with black and brown ceramics with grog and grit temper still occurring.
Stirling Phase	1100 – 1200 CE	Powell Plain and Ramey-Incised appear for the first time, tempering is predominantly shell
Moorehead Phase	1200 – 1275 CE	Limestone tempering has all but disappeared
Sand Prairie Phase	1275 – 1350 CE	Nearly all tempering is shell, Powell Plain and Ramey Incised types are no longer in use

=== Caddoan pottery ===
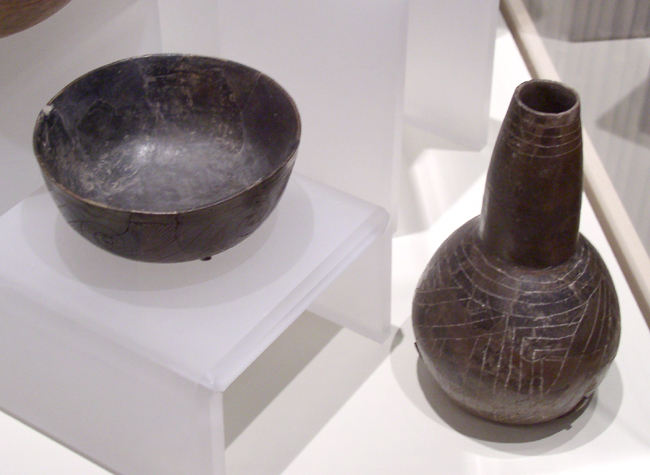
Caddoan Mississippian pottery on display at the Sam Noble Oklahoma Museum of Natural History

Pottery produced by the Caddoan Mississippian culture is some of the finest known in North America. It is usually found in the areas of Arkansas, Louisiana, Texas and Oklahoma. About 1200 CE as the Caddoan culture emerged from local woodland cultures such as Fourche Maline, a distinctive pottery tradition emerged, unmistakable because of its designs, materials and fine execution. These early pots were often grog tempered, although sometimes finely ground bone was used. Two main forms emerged that would become Caddoan pottery standards for the next 1000 years, a long slender necked bottle and a carinated form of bottles and bowls. Caddo pottery is considered to be some of the finest Mississippian pottery because of its thinness, symmetry, and very smooth finish, with some of its best examples being bottle forms with extensive geometric engravings. Pieces are often dark brown and black with a glossy finish achieved by the application of a fine slip made from a mixture of sifted fine clay or paint and buffed to a high finish. The first Europeans to encounter Caddoan pottery were members of the Hernando de Soto Expedition in 1541, who described it as matching even the finest potters of their European homeland.

That country is populous and abundant. Pottery is made there of clay, little differing from that of Estremoz or Montemor.

— Gentleman of Elvas, 1557

The coming of Europeans and the attendant population loss, forced moves, and changing economy saw the end of the Caddo pottery tradition in the 18th century, and by the end of the 19th century only vestiges of the tradition survived. The last of the original tradition of Caddo pottery was made in the late 19th century in Oklahoma. Beginning in the 1990s, Jeri Redcorn (Caddo) single-handedly revived her tribe's ceramic traditions.

=== Moundville pottery ===
There are two major varieties of pottery associated with the Pafalaya province. The Hemphill style pottery is a locally produced ware with a distinctive engraving tradition. It is found in the graves of commoners and the elite alike, as well as being found in domestic settings. The other variety consists of painted vessels, many of which were not produced locally. Unlike the engraved pottery, the negative-painted pottery only seems to have been used by the elites at the Moundville site itself, and have not been found outside of the site.

==== Hemphill style ====
The Hemphill style pottery found at the Moundville site is categorized as Moundville Engraved, variety Hemphill. They are usually thin-walled bottles and bowls, tempered with finely ground mussel shell, and polished to a glossy black surface. About 150 whole and restored examples of this style are known. Although most have been found as grave goods, some show the marks of domestic use. The Hemphill style, while similar to engraved pottery from the Tennessee Valley, the Mississippi Valley, and the Gulf Coast, reflects a distinctive local interpretation of S.E.C.C. themes. Five major themes have been identified as part of the style.

- The winged serpent-A chimeric creature with the body of a rattlesnake, feathered wings, a mammalian head and deer antlers. A local representation of the Horned Serpent.
- The crested bird- This theme involves a pair of woodpecker like birds with sinuous necks and crests tied in multiple knots around a central medallion or knot. It has a broad banded tail projecting below the center emblem. A variation of the theme features only the central medallion knot and projecting tail.
- The raptor- Similar to other falcon and eagle motifs of the S.E.C.C., this variation depicts a hooked beak bird of prey with a serrated crest, and Forked Eye Surround Motif. But, unlike raptor images from other localities(such as the Dancing birdman copper plates or shell engravings), this theme does not combine human features with the avian.
- Center symbols and bands- This theme usually has a central symbol such as the cross-and-circle, concentric circles, the swastika, the radial T-bar, or a dimple with a number of geometric ribbon-like bands extending outward. It is believed that the designs have cosmological connections to the four quarters or quadrants of the universe. Sometimes other motifs such as three conjoined fingers radiate out from the central symbols at the semi-cardinal points.
- Trophy theme- These compositions combine a checklist of motifs that include the skull, human hand, the forearm bone, trophy scalps stretched on a hoop, and the head of a raptor. Depictions of skulls show what are arguably scalp marks at the back of the head. Occasionally is included in the mix of motifs. These motifs are theorized to represent the Path of Souls, the journey of the dead into the afterlife.
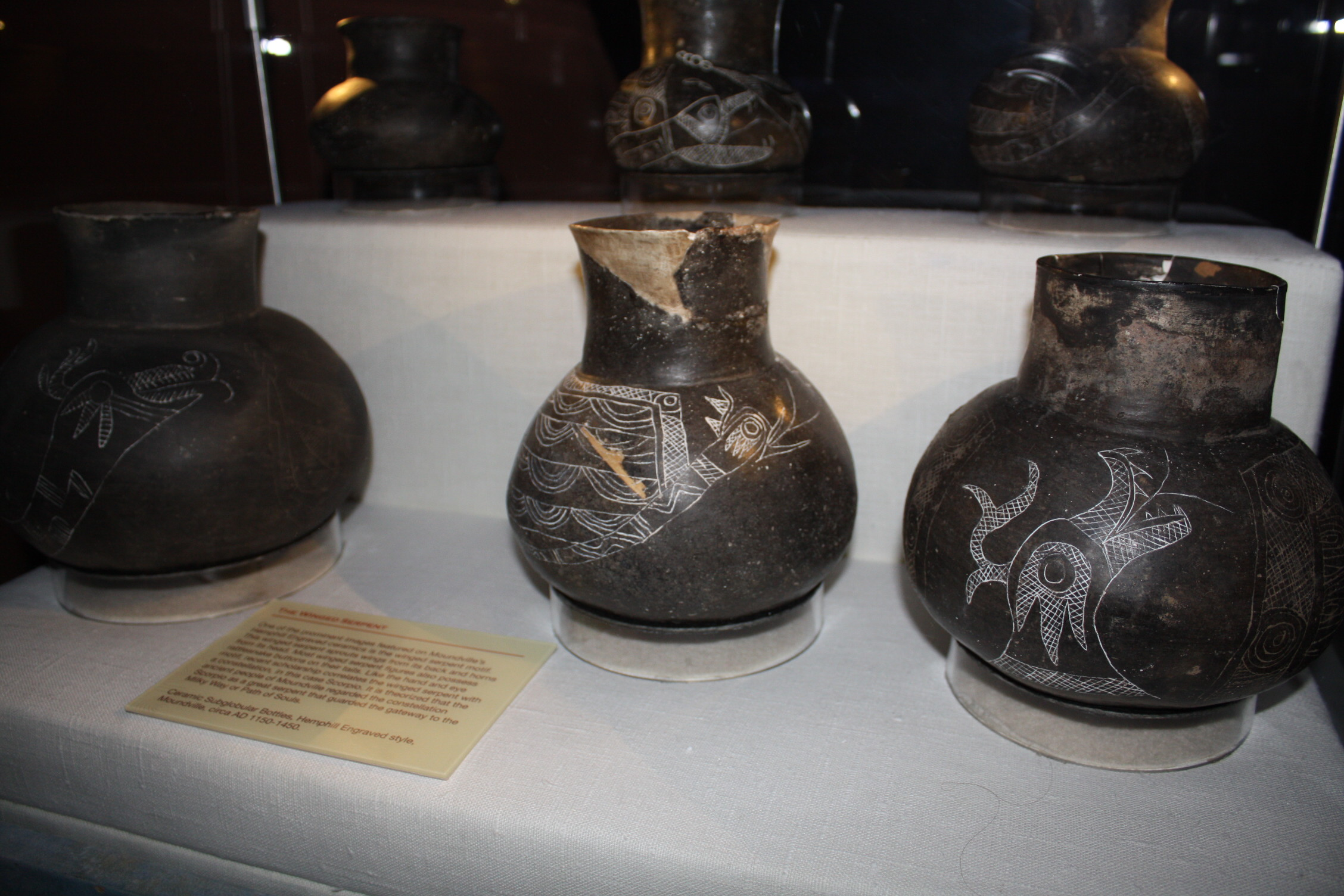
Winged Serpent theme

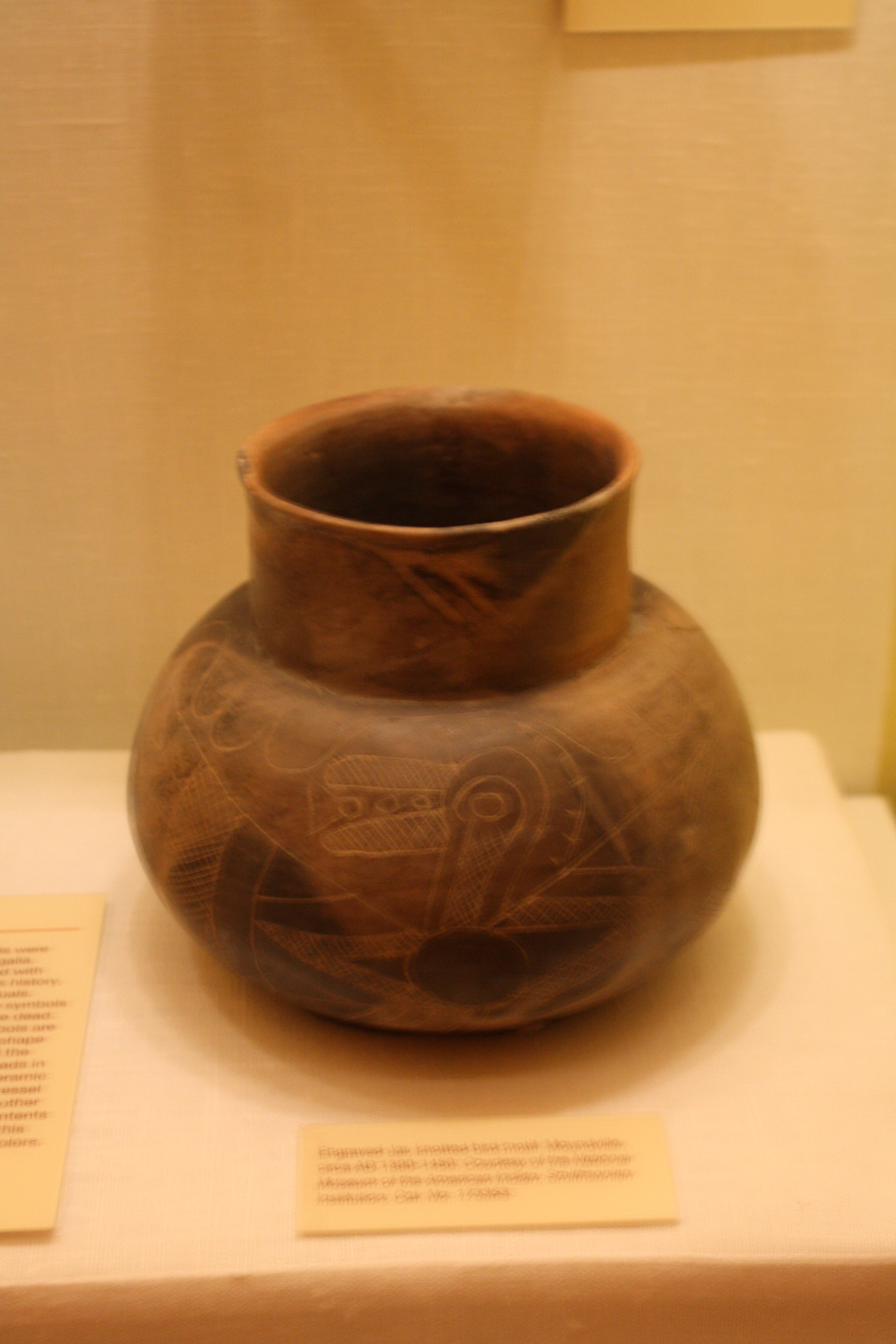
Crested bird theme

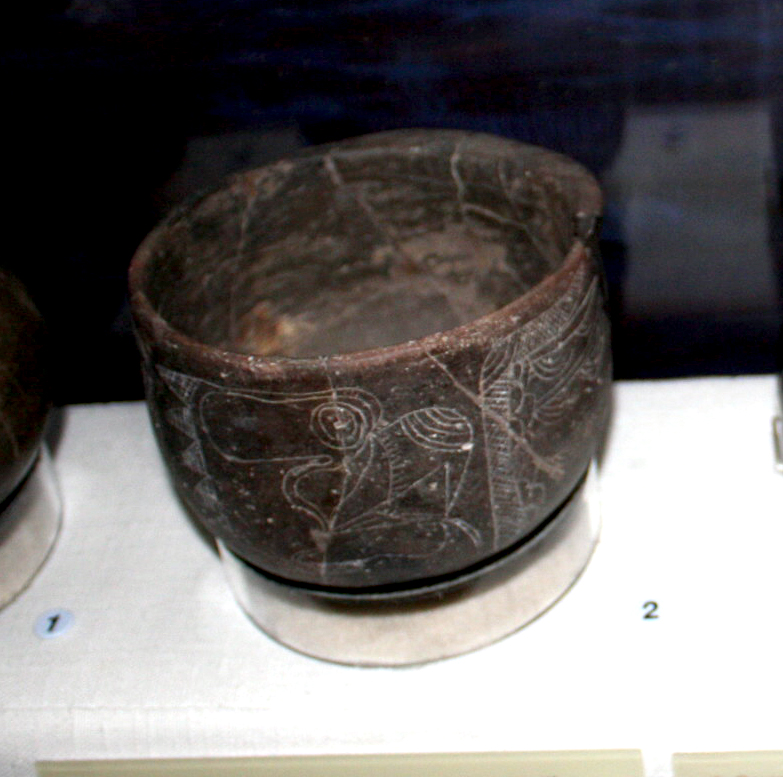
Raptor theme

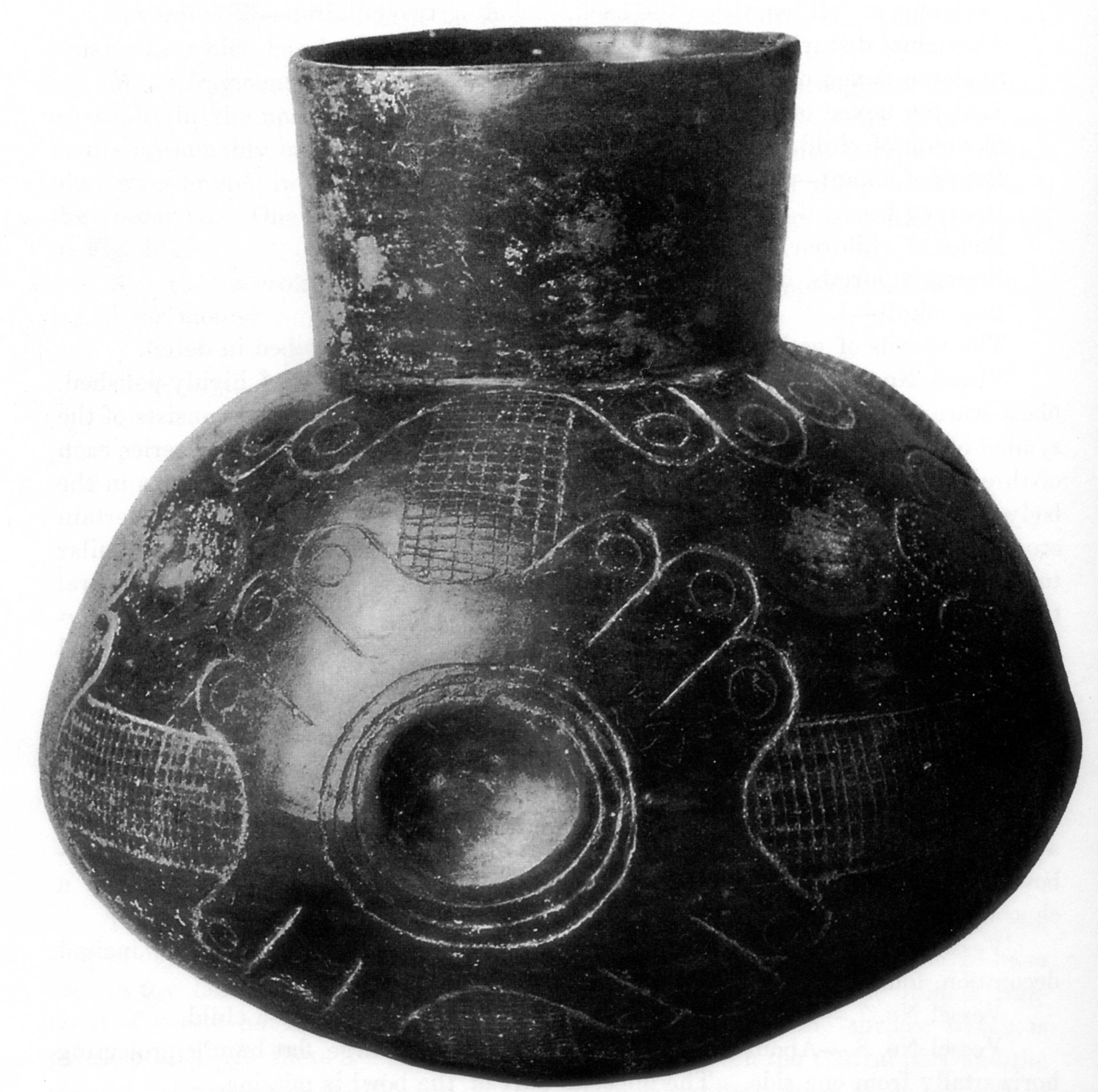
Center symbols and bands theme

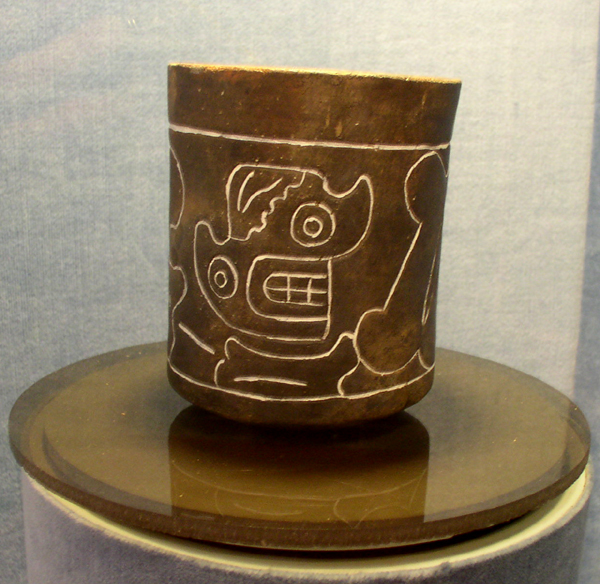
Trophy theme cup

Hemphill style pottery spans most of the 14th and the first half of the 15th century CE In this time period there were more than likely only a few potters working in this style at any one time and in some cases archaeologists have found signature features that suggest a specific potter made multiple known examples. Archaeologists have also dated the ceramics and found that the most expertly made pieces were done in the 14th century. These earlier pieces also show more influences from outside thematic sources, specifically early Walls phase and late Braden style shell engravings from the Central Mississippi Valley. As the 15th century progressed, less competency is shown by the potters, which may indicate that less importance was attached to this particular artform.

==== Moundville polychrome pottery ====
A variety of bichrome and polychrome vessels have also been found at Moundville. Stylistically they closely resemble pottery found along the Tennessee, Cumberland, the lower Ohio River and the central Mississippi Valleys. This pottery was long thought to have been imported from these other areas as trade items, and modern chemical analysis has shown that much of it is. The same analysis has also proved that some of the pottery was made locally in the Moundville polity. The polychrome pottery has representational motifs painted with red, white, and black pigments. The red and white are applied as slips of colored clay, while the black was made from carbon and applied with a negative or resist technique. Similar in manufacture to the engraved ceramics, the painted pottery has thin walls, was tempered with finely ground mussel shell and was given a polished exterior. This style comes in two major shapes, a bottle with a spherical body and a narrow curving neck and a terraced rectangular bowl that is a Moundville specialty. The rectangular bowl is a vertical-sided, flat-bottomed, rectangular vessel with an eccentric rim, specifically with one side lower than the other three so as to display the containers contents. The designs painted on the rectangular vessels are similar to motifs found on other locally produced wares and include the oblong emblem with an embedded cross-in-circle motif(thought to be a graphic representation of a scalp stretched on a hoop), the hand, the skull, the ogee, concentric circles, rayed concentric circles, rayed semicircles, and rayed spirals.

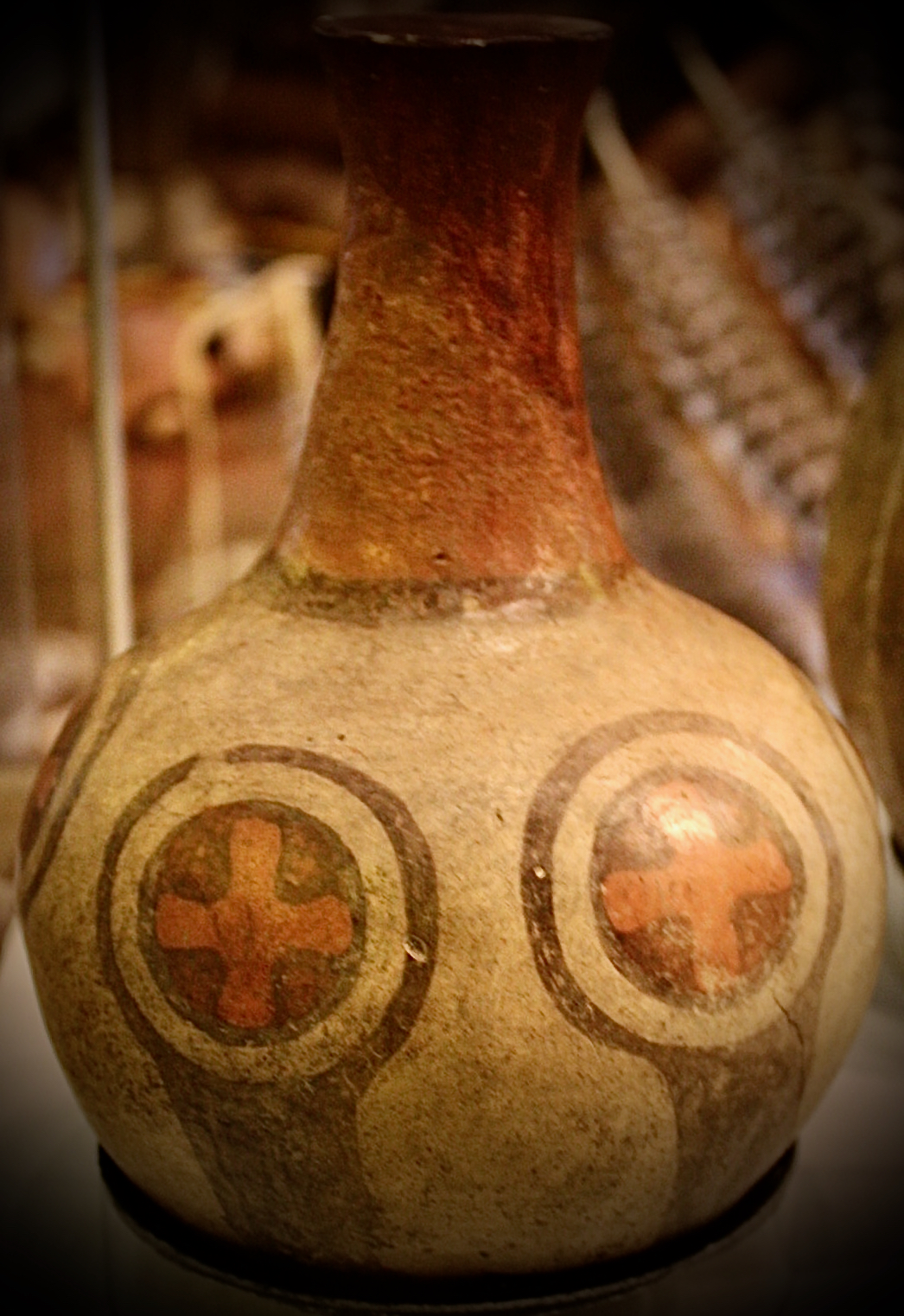
Oblong emblem with an embedded cross-in-circle motif

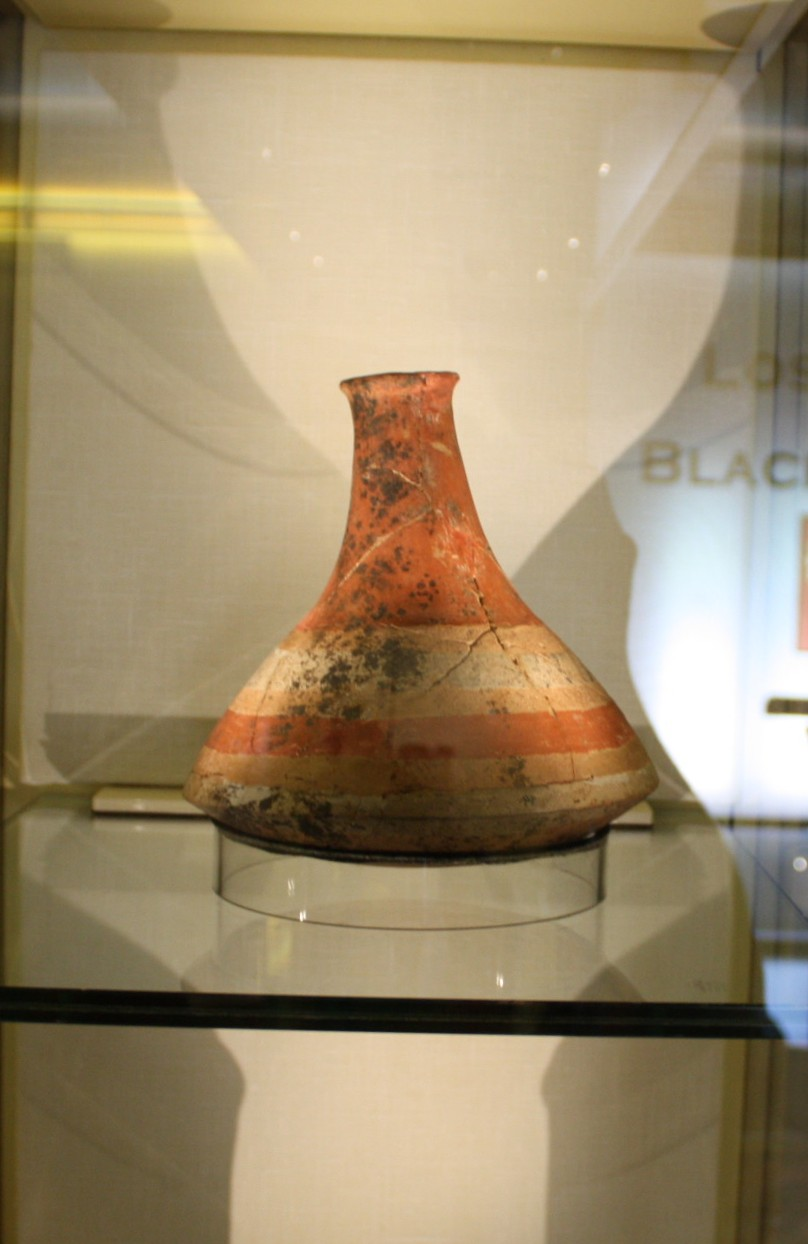
Polychrome stripped vessel

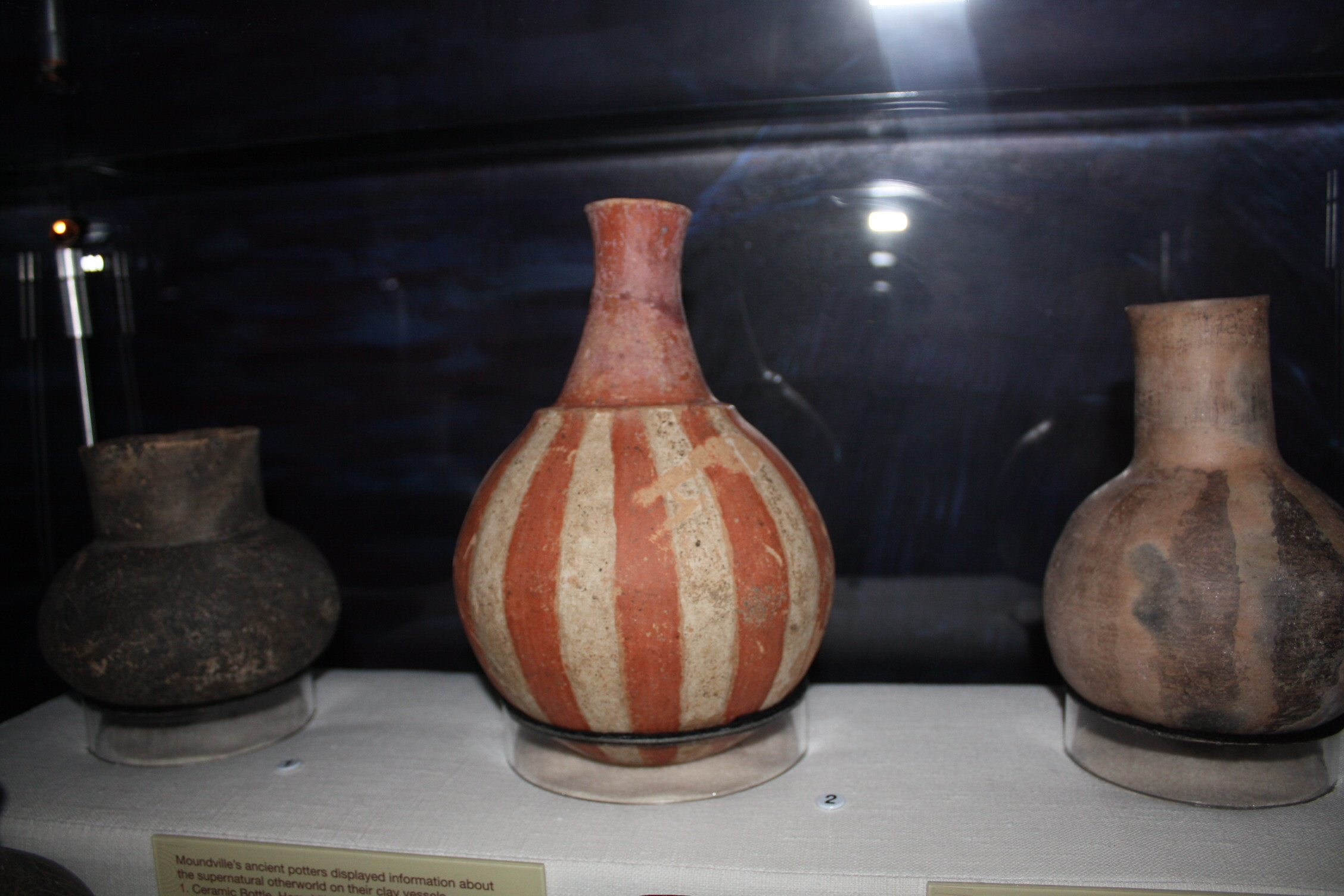
Polychrome stripped vessel

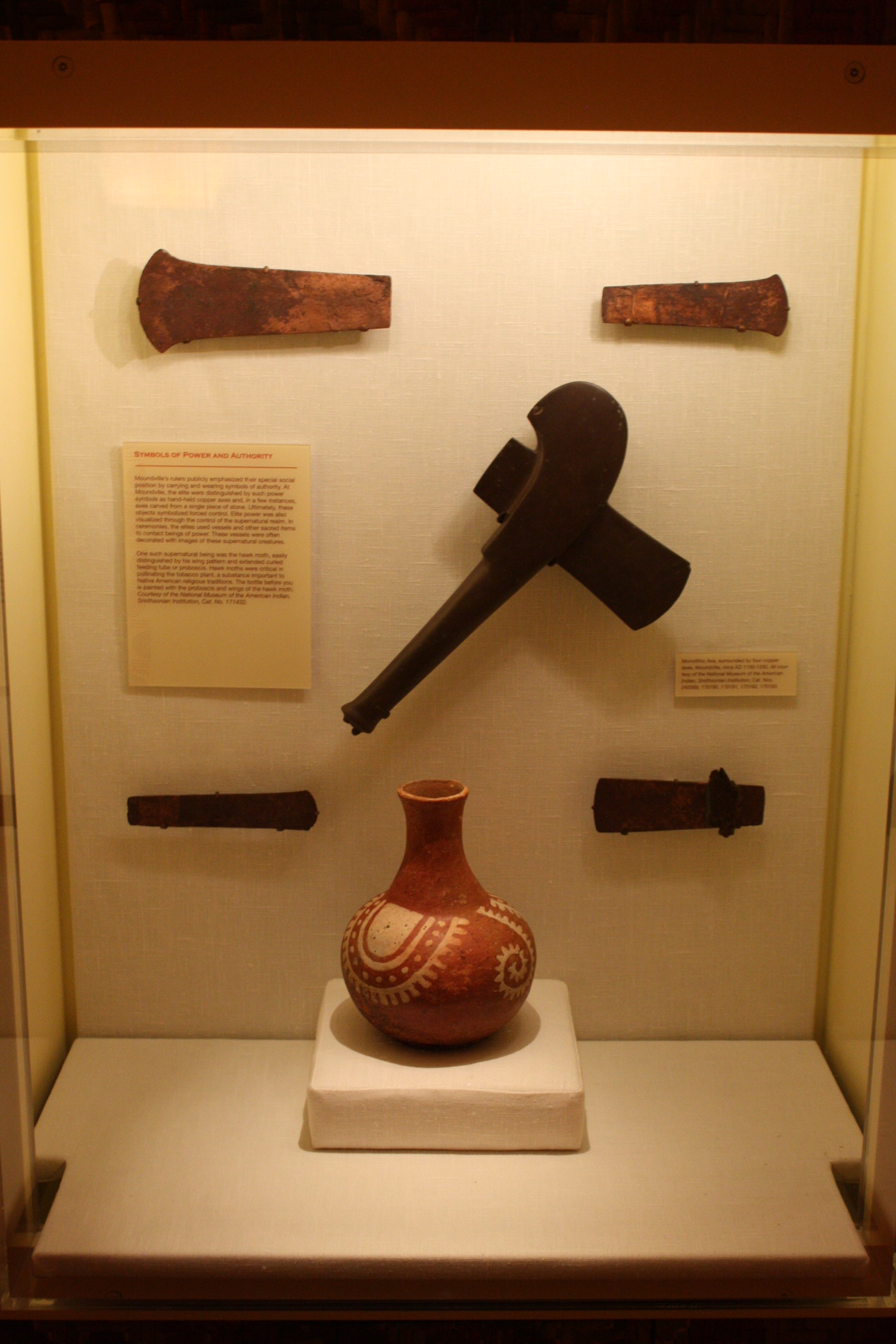
Polychrome vessel and ceremonial axes and blades

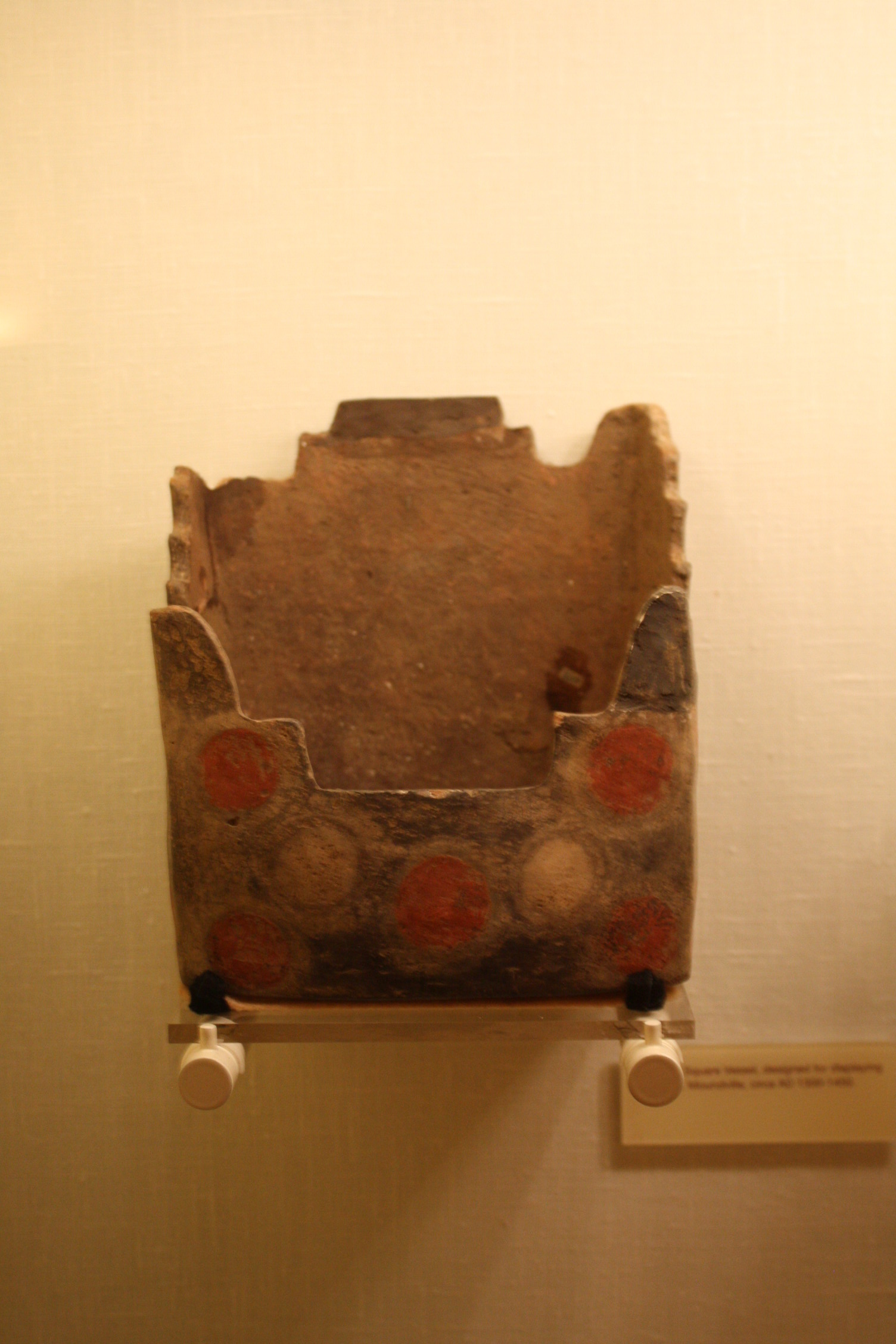
Rectangular, vertical-sided, flat-bottomed vessel

=== Southern Appalachian pottery ===
Pottery has been used to define phase sequences for Southern Appalachian Mississippian cultures. Limestone was initially used as a pottery temper before shell became the popular choice. Rounded bowls and spherical jars are the most common forms, sometimes with embellished rims and handles. Salt pans, platters, bottles, and effigies have also been unearthed. Cord-marked, coarse-tempered wares were for cooking, and serving wares were fine-tempered and highly polished. Pottery of the Piedmont and Blue Ridge regions differed dramatically from surrounding traditions; potters there used crushed quartz crystal and grit as tempers. Peoples of the Pisgah phase in Western North Carolina used sand as a tempering agent. Rim lugs and handles are absent, and vessel surfaces are either plain or decorated the "Complicated Stamped" style. The stamping paddles, made of wood or pottery, were impressed into unfired clay. Many stamps were salvaged from Nacoochee Mound in Georgia. Throughout the southeast, samples of negative pottery can be found, featuring circles, crosses, and rings of dark slip on lighter backgrounds.

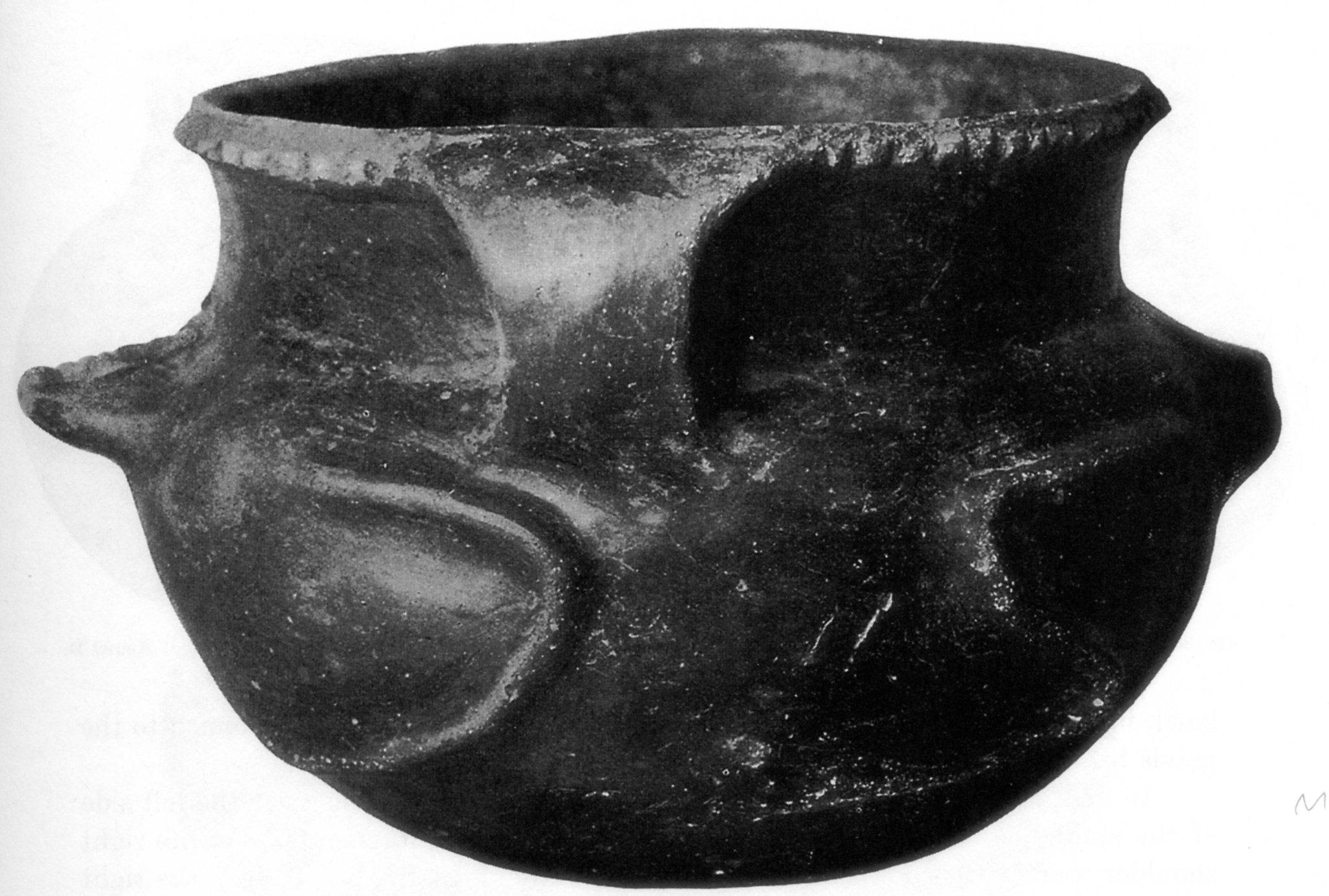
Moundville vessel with frog designs, decorated rim, and rim lugs, photo by C. B. Moore, 1905

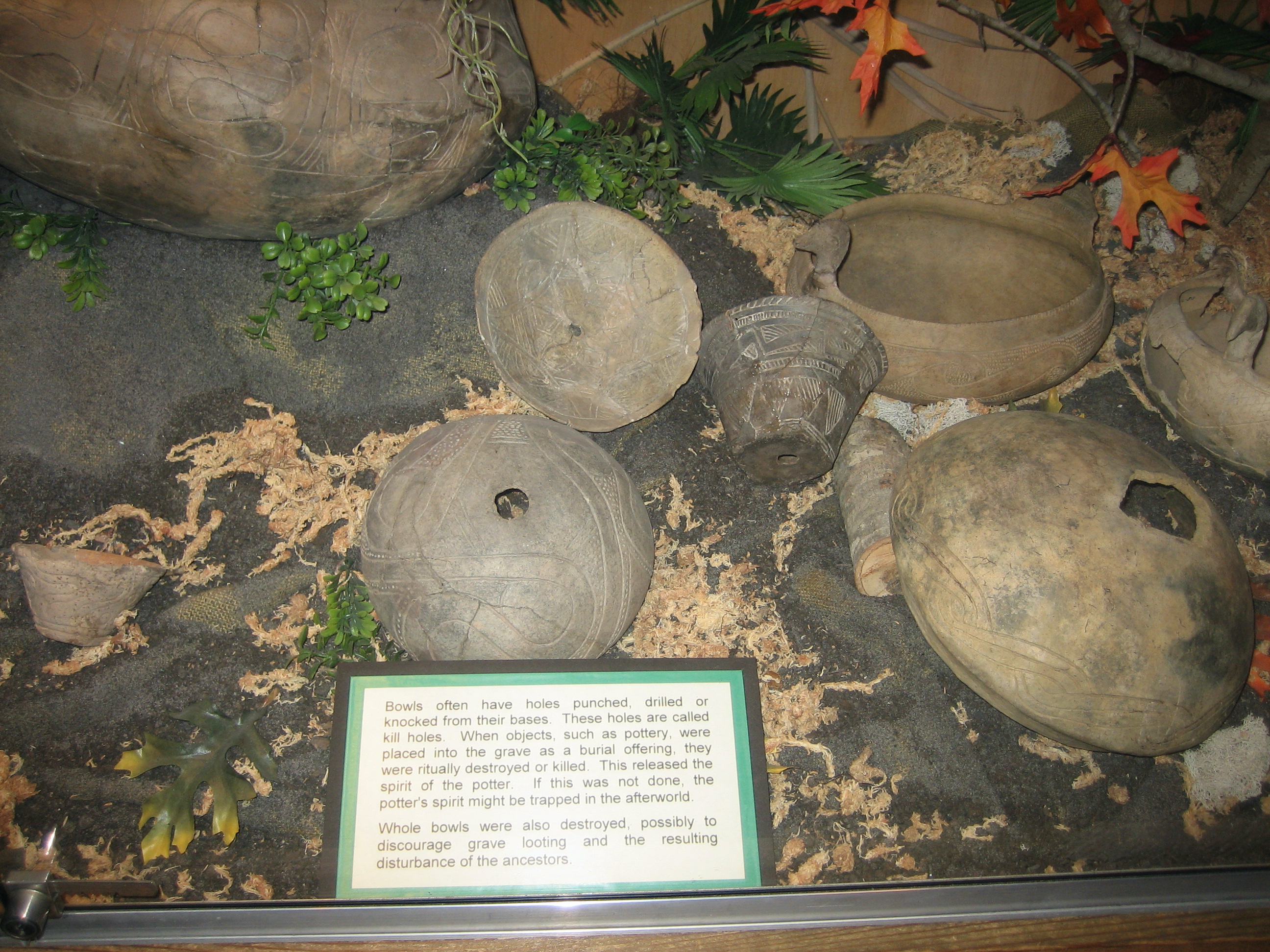
Pottery from the Fort Walton Culture

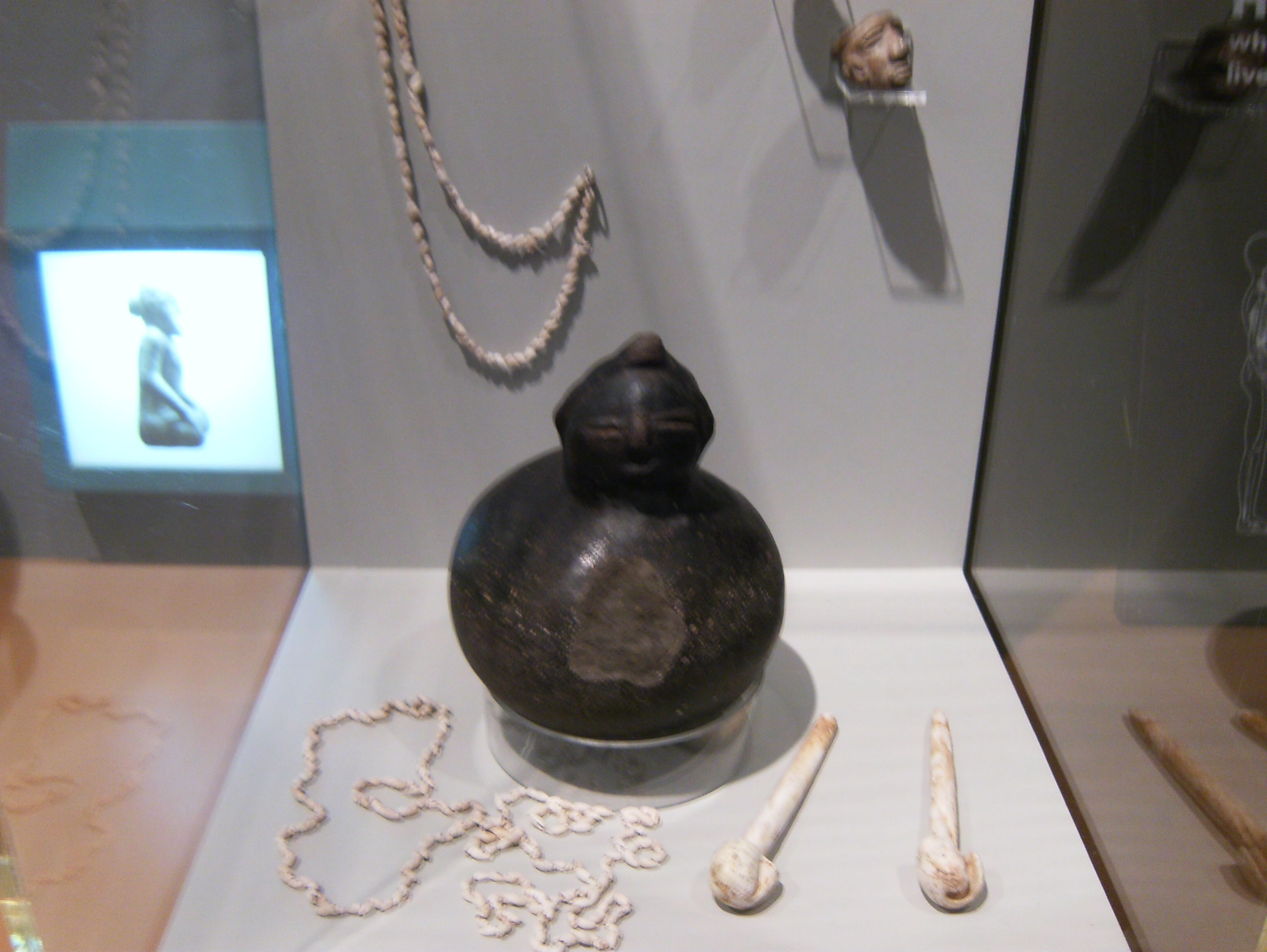
Human effigy Ocmulgee in Georgia

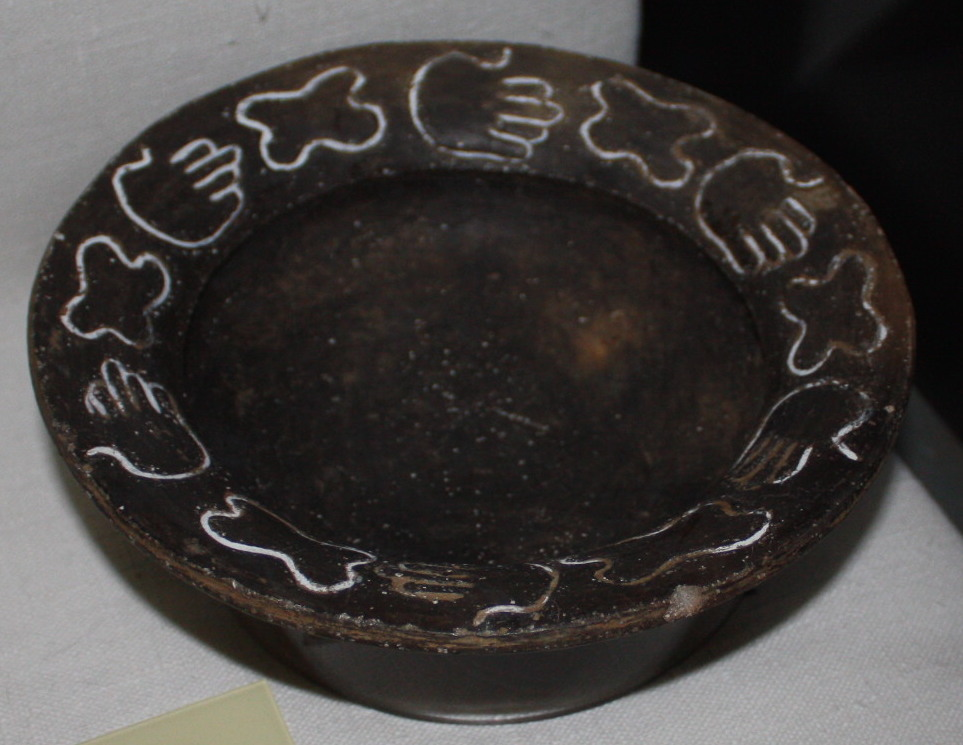
Moundville bowl with Trophy theme engravings

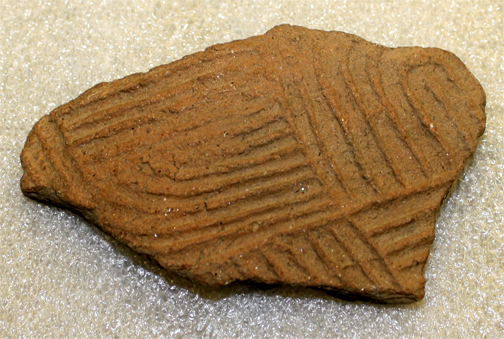
Potsherd with a stamped design, Notla Mound, North Carolina, NMAI

== In archaeology ==
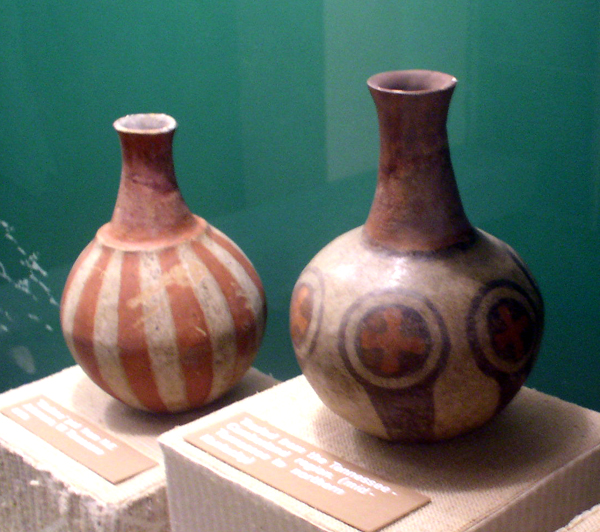
Non-local pottery found at Moundville, showing trade with other groups

Chronologies based on pottery have been essential for dating Mississippian cultures. Along with anthropologists and historians, archaeologists study of the pottery has provided one of the best insights into the culture. Because pottery is durable and often survives long after artifacts made from less durable materials have decayed past recognition, ceramics and stone tools are often the only objects that survive in great enough quantities to establish such insights. Combined with other evidence, the study of pottery artifacts is helpful in the development of theories on organisation, economic conditions and cultural development. Although the vast majority of Mississippian pottery was produced for daily utilitarian uses, the finer varieties seem to have been made specifically for trade or for ritual use. The study of this pottery has allowed inferences to be drawn about the daily life, religion, social relationships, and trade with other groups.

== Looting and modern value ==
As Europeans began to settle in the lush river valleys of the Midwest and Southeast, they discovered the abandoned village sites and monumental architecture left behind by the former Mississippian culture inhabitants of the region. Many were leveled for fields or dug into by treasure hunters. In some areas exploitation of the platform mounds became a cottage industry, as the value of the pots increased in demand on the art and antiquities markets. Many states as well as the US federal government now have laws prohibiting the looting of such sites, although the high prices these objects command on the black market has seen these laws ignored. Two of the most widely publicized sites to be looted were the Spiro Mounds site in Le Flore County, Oklahoma and the Slack Farm site in Union County, Kentucky. An actual mining company was formed (the Pocola Mining Company) to loot the Spiro site, and over a couple of years time many of the more delicate contents were destroyed as the looters dynamited the mortuary mound to gain entrance to its interior. They dynamited the Great Mortuary of Spiro in 1934, and this destruction spurred preservationists to pass laws protecting American archaeological sites.

In 1987 ten looters paid $10,000 to dig at the Slack Farm property. After two months complaints by local people led to the arrest of the perpetrators for the misdemeanor of "desecrating a venerable object" (a charge which is now a felony, in part due to the controversy over Slack Farm). Prosecution on this charge was difficult in the late 1980s, in part because this predated the passage of the Native American Graves Protection and Repatriation Act and related state legislation, which made it clearer that such activities were illegal. The illegal digging of such objects destroys much of their archaeological value, as it removes its association from its surroundings. The situation in which an article is found, its level of burial, its surroundings and even its original condition are valuable in determining the history of many sites, all of which are lost when an object is removed in secret, unrecorded in its provenance, and lost to the antiquities black market.

== See also ==
- Ceramics of Indigenous peoples of the Americas
- Fort Ancient culture pottery
- Hopewell pottery
- Plaquemine culture pottery
- Mississippian stone statuary
- Visual arts by Indigenous peoples of the Americas
