= Tipton phase =

Archaeological phase in North America

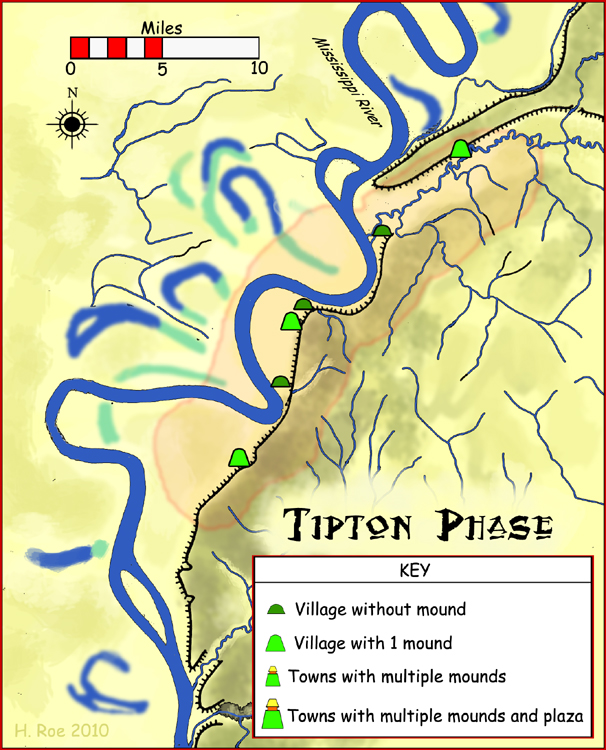
The Tipton phase and some of its associated sites

The Tipton phase is an archaeological phase in southwestern Tennessee of the Late Mississippian culture. Other contemporaneous groups in the area include the Parkin phase, Walls phase, Menard phase, and the Nodena phase. The Tipton phase is the last prehistoric people to inhabit the area before the arrival of Europeans. It is located directly across the Mississippi River from the people of the Nodena phase and directly north of the Walls phase. During the early 1540s the Hernando de Soto Expedition passed through the area, stopping at many villages in the area. The phase itself is named for Tipton County, Tennessee.
