= Walls phase =

Archaeological phase of the Late Mississippian culture

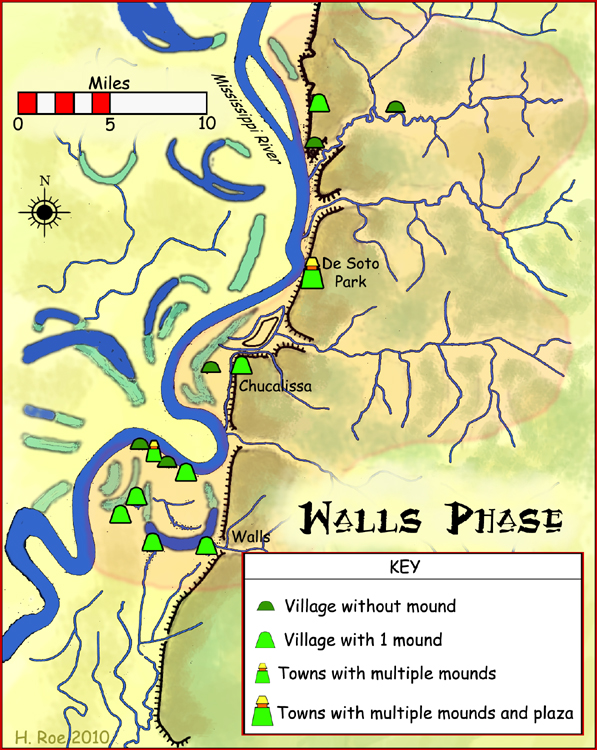
The Walls phase and some of its associated sites

The Walls phase is an archaeological phase in southwestern Tennessee and northwestern Mississippi of the Late Mississippian culture. Chucalissa is a Walls phase mound and plaza complex located on a bluff overlooking the Mississippi River. Other contemporaneous groups in the area include the Parkin phase, Tipton phase, Menard phase, and the Nodena phase.

The Walls phase is the last prehistoric people to inhabit the Memphis area before the arrival of Europeans. During the early 1540s the Hernando de Soto Expedition passed through the area, stopping at many villages along the way. It is thought that the Walls phase may be the Province of Quizquiz, a Tunican people encountered by de Soto on the banks of the Mississippi River.

== Culture ==
=== Settlement pattern ===
The Walls phase settlements consist of one large site, located at De Soto Park in Memphis, nine single mound sites, and six smaller moundless villages scattered along the natural levees and bluffs of De Soto County, Mississippi and Shelby County, Tennessee. Included among the secondary sites are Chucalissa, the Lake Cormorant site, the Irby site, the Cheatham site, and the Woodlyn site. Although only a few of those sites have surviving mounds. The phase itself is named for a site near the small town of Walls, Mississippi. The Belle Meade phase is located across the Mississippi River from the Walls phase on its western bank, and the Tipton phase is located directly north, also on the eastern bank of the Mississippi River.

=== Pottery ===
Walls ceramics consist mainly of large globular jars, short necked water bottles and many different bowl forms. The pottery was usually decorated by incising and engraving lines, punctated patterns and the application of handles and appendages to the vessel form. The frequency of different vessel types and pastes have helped to define the phase from surrounding phases. Like at most Mississippian sites, Mississippi Plain and Bell Plain are the most common types. Other types include Parkin Punctated, Barton Incised, Old Town Red Filmed, Walls Engraved, Rhodes Incised, Ranch Incised, and Hull Engraved.

=== In popular culture ===
The Walls Culture (as Quizquiz) appears in the video game Europa Universalis IV as an indigenous nation.
