= Hodges House (Bismarck, Arkansas) =

Historic house in Arkansas, United States

- U.S. National Register of Historic Places
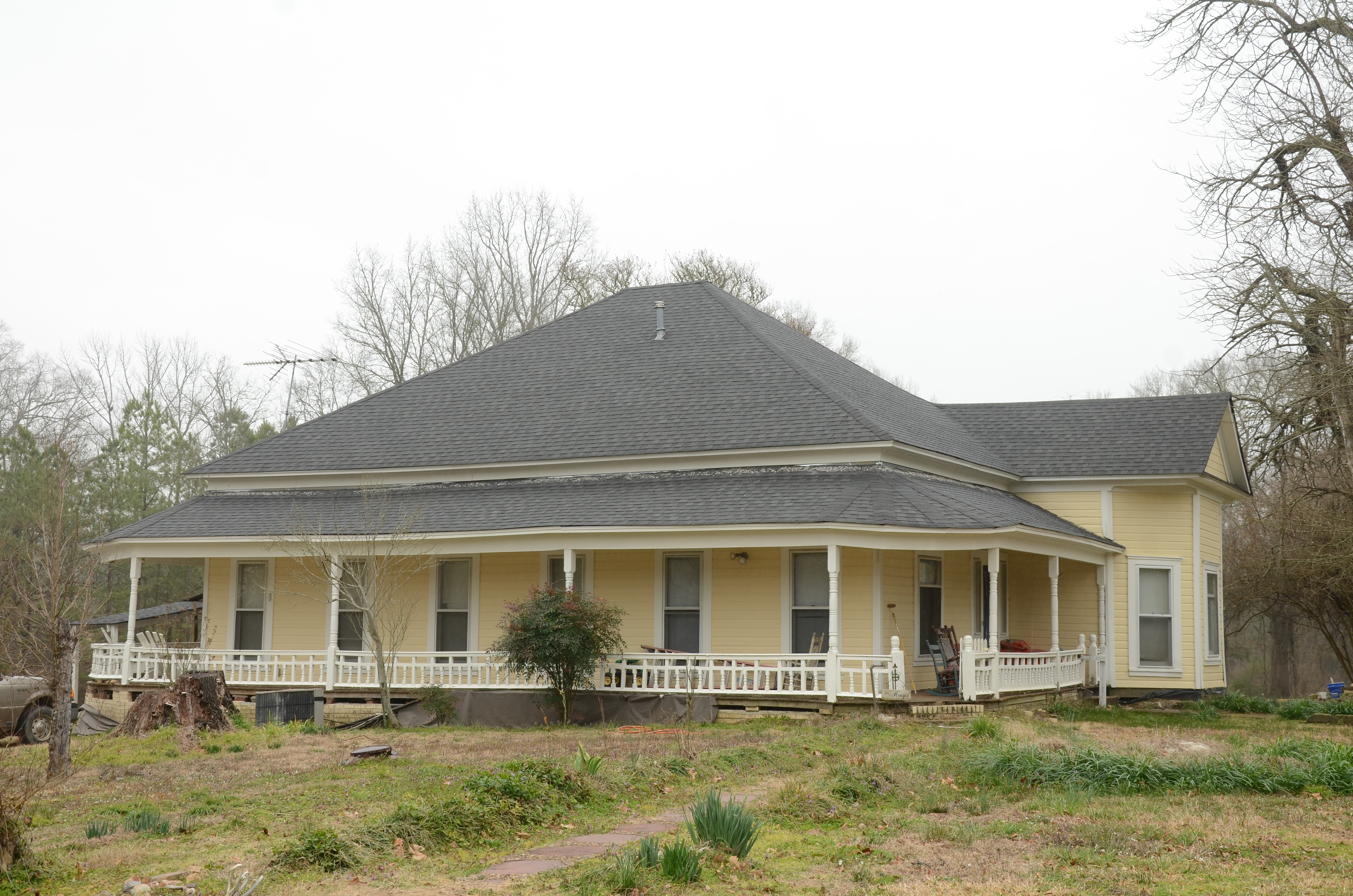

- Location within Arkansas Location within the United States
- Location: AR 7, Bismarck, Arkansas
- Coordinates: 34°16′23″N 93°8′53″W
- Area: 1.5 acres (0.61 ha)
- Built: 1907
- Architectural style: Folk Victorian
- NRHP reference No.: 95000683
- Added to NRHP: June 2, 1995

The Hodges House is a historic house on the east side of Arkansas Highway 7 south of the rural community of Bismarck, Arkansas. It is a distinctive single-story wood-frame house, with a projecting polygonal bay at one corner, and a porch that wraps around three sides of the house. The porch is supported by turned posts and has an elaborate Folk Victorian balustrade. The house was built in 1907 by Lee and Clara DeBray, and was sold to Thomas and Charlotte Hodges in 1925. Both of the Hodgeses were leading figures in the early development of archaeology in the state of Arkansas, amassing a collection of more than 50,000 artifacts, and occupying leadership positions in the Arkansas Archaeological Society. The Menard–Hodges site, now a National Historic Landmark, was purchased by Hodges in order to control research and preservation activities.

The house was listed on the National Register of Historic Places in 1995.

== See also ==
- National Register of Historic Places listings in Hot Spring County, Arkansas
