= Parkin Archeological State Park =

Archaeological site

- Parkin Indian Mound
- U.S. National Register of Historic Places
- U.S. National Historic Landmark
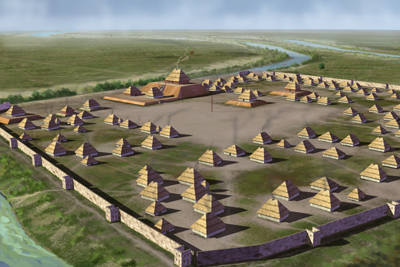
- Artist's conception of the archaeological site

- Location within Arkansas Location within the United States
- Nearest city: Parkin, Arkansas
- Coordinates: 35°16′37.70″N 90°33′26.66″W
- NRHP reference No.: 66000200

Significant dates
- Added to NRHP: October 15, 1966
- Designated NHL: July 19, 1964

Parkin Archeological State Park, also known as Parkin Indian Mound, is an archeological site and state park in Parkin, Cross County, Arkansas. Around 1350–1650 CE an aboriginal palisaded village existed at the site, at the confluence of the St. Francis and Tyronza rivers. Artifacts from this site are on display at the site museum. The Parkin site is the type site for the Parkin phase, an expression of the Mississippian culture from the Late Mississippian period. Many archeologists believe it to be part of the province of Casqui, documented as visited by Spanish explorer Hernando de Soto in 1542. Archeological artifacts from the village of the Parkin people are dated to 1400–1650 CE.

The Parkin site was declared a National Historic Landmark in 1964 for its significance as a type site of the Parkin phase. In 1966, the Parkin Indian Mound was listed in the National Register of Historic Places. Parkin Archeological State Park is located at 60 Arkansas Highway 184 North, Parkin, Arkansas.

== Culture of the Parkin phase ==
The Parkin site is the type site for an important Late Mississippian cultural component, the Parkin phase, which dates from about 1400–1700 CE. The Parkin phase was a collection of villages along the St. Francis and Tyronza rivers. This culture is contemporary with the Caborn-Welborn culture and Menard, Tipton, Walls and the Nodena phases. It has been determined that the site was continuously occupied for at least 500 years.

In the early 1540s, the Spanish Hernando de Soto expedition is believed to have visited several sites in the Parkin phase, which is usually identified as the province of Casqui, with the Nodena phase being identified as the province of Pacaha.

The province was named by the De Soto Expedition for the chieftain Casqui, who ruled the tribe from its primary village. The De Soto chroniclers indicate that political provinces were the major political institutions of this area; they were characterized by a paramount chief living in a paramount town, with satellite vassal towns surrounding it. The Parkin phase is a series of twenty-one villages of varying sizes along the St. Francis and Tyronza rivers, most of them roughly 2.5 miles (4 km) apart from each other. These sites include the Rose Mound, Glover, Neeleys Ferry, and Barton Ranch.

=== Settlement pattern ===
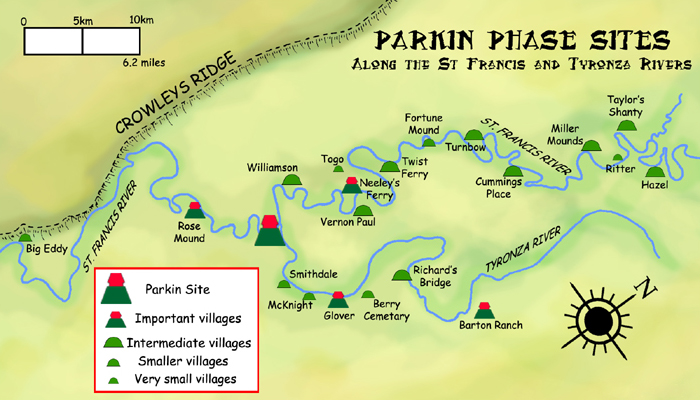
The distribution of Parkin phase sites along the St. Francis and Tyronza rivers, the area the Spanish called the province of Casqui.

| Village type | Known sites | Site size | Features |
|---|---|---|---|
| Paramount village | Parkin site | 17 acres (6.9 ha) | Substructure mounds, palisade and moat |
| Important villages | Barton Ranch(3CT18); Glover; Neeley's Ferry(3CS24); Rose Mound(3CS27) | 6.7 to 9.1 acres (2.7–3.7 ha) | Substructure mounds, palisade and moat |
| Intermediate villages | 9 sites known | 3.7 to 5.9 acres (1.5–2.4 ha) | Palisade and moat, some mounds |
| Smaller villages | 5 sites known | 0.7 to 2.0 acres (0.3–0.8 ha) | Palisade and moat, some mounds |
| Very small villages | Ritter, Togo | < 0.7 acres (0.3 ha) | Palisade, no mounds, no moat |

During the preceding periods, homesteads and small villages had developed throughout the area, but by this time endemic warfare had forced the populations to consolidate into the palisaded villages. They would leave their villages during the day to farm their fields, collect wood, and hunt, but at night return to the safety of their well-defended villages. The people of the Parkin phase were relatively isolated and protected from people of other phases to their east and southeast by swamps, which the Spanish chroniclers described as some of the worst they had crossed. The swamps acted as buffer zones between the competing, hostile phases.

As time went on, the people of the Parkin phase developed a material culture that increasingly diverged from that of the surrounding phases. Among other indicators, this distinction was characterized by changes in pottery designs and mortuary practices. The cultural changes show that the peoples of the Parkin phase were becoming isolated from their neighbors not only culturally but also physically. Motifs on artifacts found at the Parkin phase sites show that the people were part of the Southeastern Ceremonial Complex, an extensive religious and trade network that brought Mill Creek chert, whelk shells, and other exotic goods to the Parkin phase sites.

=== Agriculture and food ===
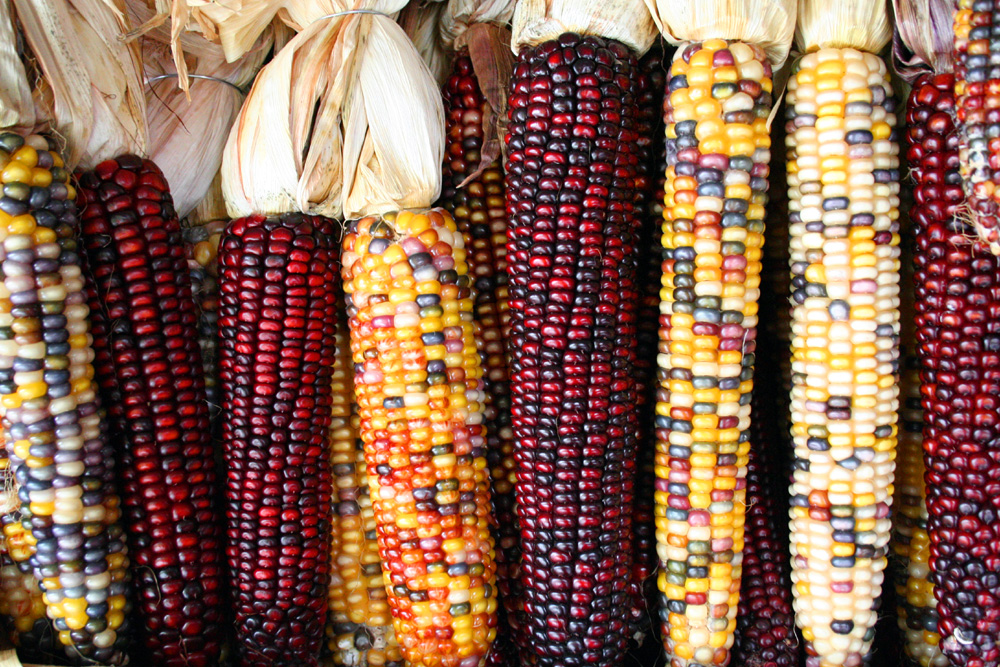
Maize was the main foodstuff grown by the peoples of Parkin

The people of Parkin were intensely involved in maize agriculture, as well as cultivating other food crops originating in the Americas, such as beans, gourds, squash, and sunflowers. Women managed most of the cultivation and processing, including developing varieties of maize and vegetables. After the harvest, maize was stored in large above ground cribs for consumption during the remainder of the year. The women also gathered wild foodstuffs such as pecans and persimmons.

The De Soto chroniclers described the area as being intensely cultivated, and as the most populous they had seen in La Florida. They said there were groves of wild fruit and nut-bearing trees, implying that the Parkin phase peoples must have chosen to retain them while clearing other trees for the cultivation of maize and their other crops. The men hunted such game as whitetail deer, squirrel, rabbit, turkey, and mallard, as well as fishing for alligator gar, catfish, drum, turtles and mussels. The two rivers and the moat must have been a very productive source of fish, as the De Soto chroniclers often mentioned receiving "gifts of fish" from the residents of Casqui.

=== Language ===
The people of Parkin were probably Tunican or Siouan speaking. It is known that the Tunica were in the area at the time of the de Soto Entrada. The related group of phases present in the region may have all been Tunica peoples, with Caddoan speakers to their west and south. By the time of later European contact in the 1670s and the beginning of the historic period, the area was occupied by the Quapaw, who spoke a Dhegiha Siouan language. Unsuccessful attempts have been made to connect pottery styles and words from the de Soto narratives with the Quapaw.

== Parkin site 1350–1650 CE ==
This town was a very good one, thoroughly well stockaded; and the walls were furnished with towers and a ditch round about, for the most part full of water which flows in by a canal from the river; and this ditch was full of excellent fish of divers kinds. The chief of Casqui came to the Christians when they were entering the village and they entertained him bravely. In Aquixo, and Casqui, and Pacaha, they saw the best villages seen up to that time, better stockaded and fortified, and the people were of finer quality, excepting those of Cofitachequi.

— -RODRIGO RANJEL 1547–49

Animation of what the Parkin site may have looked like circa 1540

The site was a 17 acres (7 ha) palisaded village at the confluence of the St. Francis and Tyronza rivers. All other sites of the Parkin phase are located on very fertile soil, but not the Parkin site. The soil is not adequate to support the population level that is thought to have resided at the site. It is believed that the large village was located at the confluence of the two rivers because this allowed the residents to control transportation and trade on the waterways.

The site had one large substructure mound and six smaller ones arranged around a central plaza. The largest mound was 21.3 feet (6.5 m) tall, with a projecting terrace level that was 5 feet (1.5 m) tall. It is located beside the St. Francis River, with the plaza on its other side. The Spanish chroniclers describe the main mound as having a large structure at its summit, which was the residence of the chief, Casqui. The terrace level held the homes and other structures used by his wives and attendants.

The other six mounds ranged from 3.2 to 5 feet (1.0–1.5 m) in height. The plaza would have been used for religious rituals and the playing of games such as chunkey and the ballgame. Surrounding the plaza were numerous well-laid out houses, aligned to the axis of the mound and plaza, demonstrating the planned nature of the site. The villages of this area were described as having few if any trees, probably because wood was the primary source of fuel and building materials. The Spanish camped within a nearby grove of trees to avoid the sweltering heat on the floodplain. Homes were built from wattle and daub, with thatched roofs.

The palisade which surrounded the site on three sides was designed for defensive purposes. It had bastions at regular intervals, with archers slots to defend against plundering enemies. Immediately outside the palisade was a large moat, which surrounded the site on three sides and connected to the St. Francis River, which was its fourth side. The area inside the ditch and palisade was 3.2 feet (1 m) higher than the surrounding land. Although the level of the site may have been raised by the inhabitants, it is more likely that dirt and refuse built up in the confined space and raised its level gradually, similar to a tell in the Middle East.

=== Pottery ===
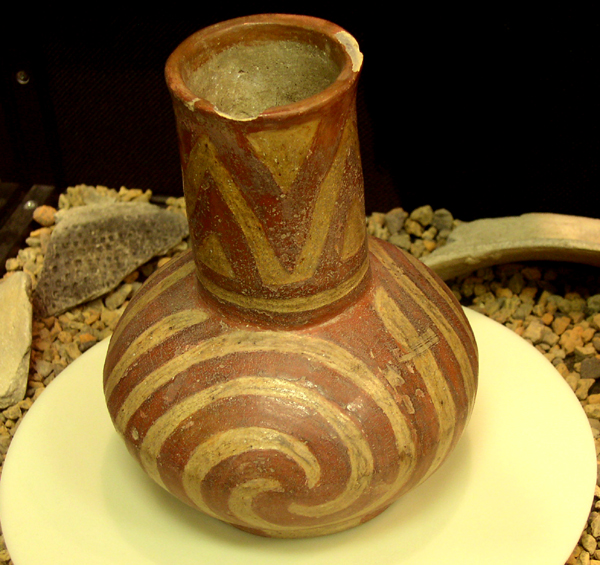
S.E.C.C. motif mortuary pot from the Parkin site

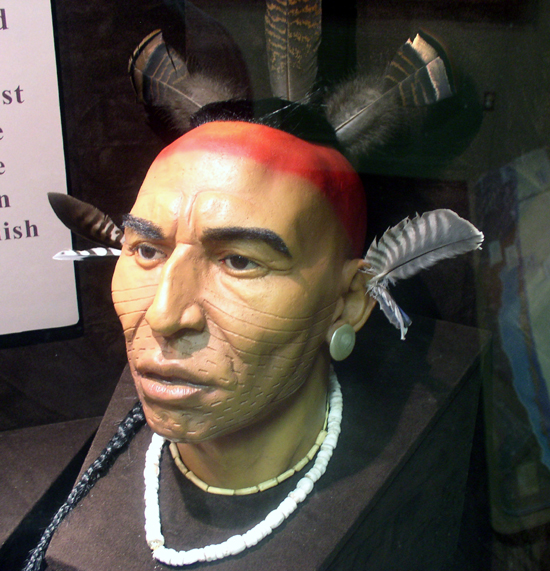
Bust showing how inhabitants may have looked

Most pottery found at the Parkin site is of the kind known as Mississippian Plain var. Neeleys Ferry and Barton Incised var. Togo (formerly called Parkin Punctated). Pottery found at Parkin phase sites are usually utilitarian wares rather than the elaborate mortuary types found at the Nodena, Kent or Walls phase burials. The archaeologist Clarence Bloomfield Moore described pottery from St. Francis River sites with adjectives such as "lopsided", "insufficiently fired", "rude and scanty", of "inferior surface" and "great monotony". But elaborate effigy pottery has also been found at these sites, including five human head effigy pots, underwater panther effigies, elaborate fish and dog effigies, and red and white spiral, swastika and stripped bottles. The inclusion of less specifically mortuary wares found in graves seems to be a cultural difference between the Parkin peoples and the peoples of the surrounding phases.

The Parkin phase people put a bowl and a bottle into a grave with the bodies, as did the people of the Nodena, Walls, and Kent phases. Pottery made by the Parkin people was built up from strips of clay, and then smoothed out by the potter. This technique was much like that of other pottery in the Eastern America area, where the potters wheel was unknown. Slips using galena for white, hematite for red, and sometimes graphite for black were used to paint the pottery. The effigy head pots give an idea of what the people of the Parkin site may have looked like, as shown by this bust on display at the Parkin site museum.

=== Spanish artifacts ===
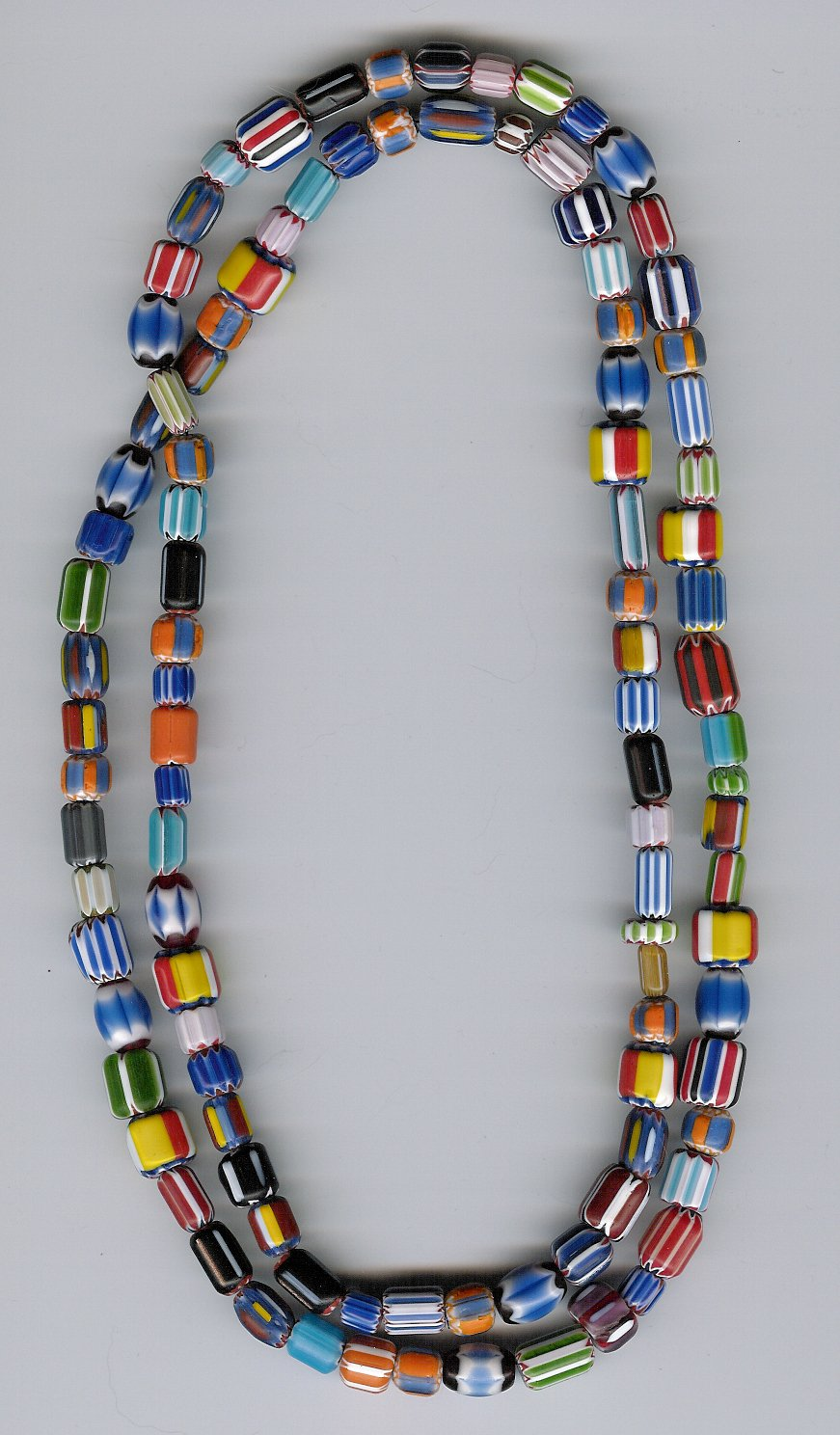
Glass chevron beads of the type used by the Spanish

On the day of our arrival, the Cacique said that inasmuch as he knew the Governor to be a man from the sky, who must necessarily have to go away, he besought him to leave a sign, of which he might ask support in his wars, and his people call upon for rain, of which their fields had great need, as their children were dying of hunger. The Governor commanded that a very tall cross be made of two, pines, and told him to return the next day, when he would give him the sign from heaven for which he asked; but that the Chief must believe nothing could be needed if he had a true faith in the cross. He returned the next day, complaining much because we so long delayed giving him the sign he asked, and he had good- will to serve and follow us. Thereupon he set up a loud wailing because the compliance was not immediate, which caused us all to weep, witnessing such devotion and earnestness in his entreaties. The Governor told him to bring all his people back in the evening, and that we would go with them to his town and take thither the sign he had asked. He came in the afternoon with them, and we went in procession to the town, while they followed us. Arriving there, as it is the custom of the Caciques to have near their houses a high hill, made by hand, some having the houses placed thereon, we set up the cross on the summit of a mount, and we all went on bended knees, with great humility, to kiss the foot of that cross. The Indians did the same as they saw us do, nor more nor less; then directly they brought a great quantity of cane, making a fence about it; and we returned that night to our camp.

— - LUYS HERNANDEZ De BIEMA, 1544

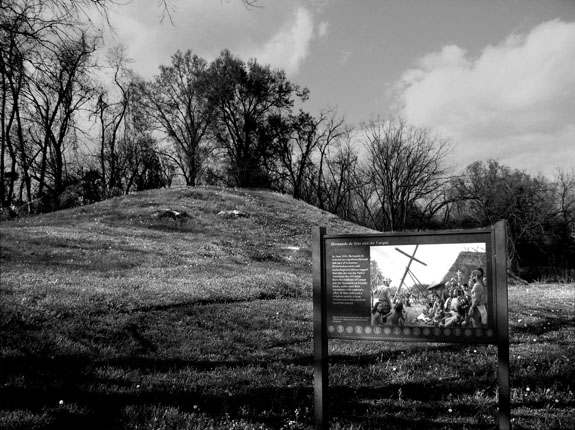
Main mound and its interpretative sign at the Parkin site

In 1966, a Spanish trade bead, which matches descriptions of the seven-layer glass beads carried by the expedition, was found at the Parkin site, as well as a brass bell known as a "Clarksdale bell". The bell was associated with a child's burial, which also contained four pottery items, all known types of Parkin phase pottery. This is one of only a handful of sites in the Southeast where items from the de Soto expedition have been found in a datable archaeological context. In 1977, a large charred posthole was found at the summit of the large substructure mound at the Parkin site. In 2016, a portion of a cypress log, believed to be part of the cross that De Soto erected on the site in 1541, was unearthed. It was still under study in April 2016.

== See also ==
- Mississippian culture
- List of Mississippian sites
- List of sites and peoples visited by the Hernando de Soto Expedition
- Southeastern Ceremonial Complex
- List of National Historic Landmarks in Arkansas
- National Register of Historic Places listings in Cross County, Arkansas
