= Menard–Hodges site =

Archaeological site in Arkansas, United States

Menard–Hodges site 3 AR 4
- Osotouy
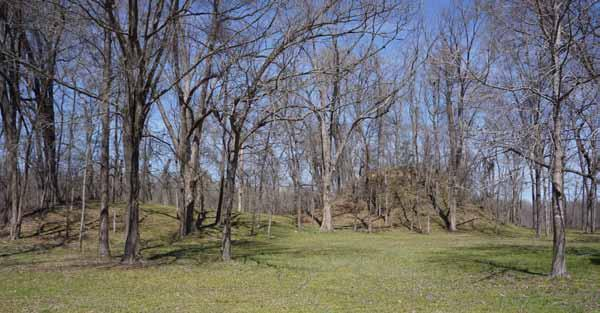

- Location within Arkansas today
- 34°0′13.93″N 91°15′15.17″W
- Cultures: Mississippian culture, Quapaw
- Location: Nady, Arkansas, US
- Region: Arkansas County, Arkansas

Site notes
- Architectural style: platform mounds
- Archaeologists: James A. Ford
- Menard–Hodges site
- U.S. National Register of Historic Places
- U.S. National Historic Landmark
- NRHP reference No.: 85003542

Significant dates
- Added to NRHP: October 31, 1985
- Designated NHL: April 11, 1989

The Menard–Hodges site (3AR4) (also known as Menard-Hodges Mounds and Osotouy), is an archaeological site in Arkansas County, Arkansas. It includes two large platform mounds as well as several house mounds. It is the type site for the Menard phase, a protohistoric Mississippian culture group.

The Menard Mound was named for Frank Menard, on whose farm the mound was discovered.

== Description ==
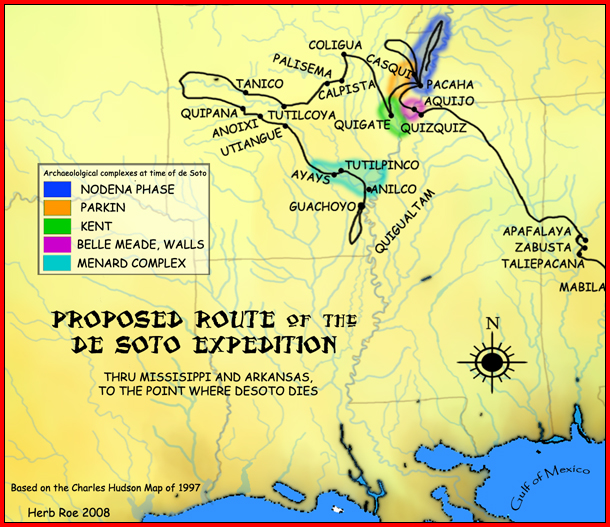
The proposed Hernando de Soto route thru Arkansas

The site is considered as a possible candidate for the province of Anilco encountered by the Hernando de Soto Entrada in 1540. It was contemporaneous with the Parkin site, believed by many archaeologists to be the location of the province of Casqui, and the Nodena site, believed by many archaeologists to be the location of the province of Pacaha.

The site is also considered to be the location of the protohistoric Quapaw village of Osotouy (or Ossoteoue) first encountered by French explorers in the late 17th century. The Quapaw at the time had four villages, Kappa, Ossoteoue, Touriman, and Tonginga. Kappa was reported to have been on the eastern bank of the Mississippi River and the other three located on the western bank in or near present-day Desha County, Arkansas. The location was excavated by James A. Ford in 1958. The excavations included burials, with graves in extended, flexed, and secondary interments scattered throughout the site and oriented in many different directions. The site has yielded evidence of occupation as early as the Baytown Period (300-700 CE), all the way to the European contact period in the 16th century. The most unusual formation at the site is Mound A, which is conical in shape, and was built in two stages. Ceramics found at the site are consistent with native occupation at the time Henri de Tonti established the first French outpost west of the Mississippi at the Arkansas Post in 1686.

The site was listed on the National Register of Historic Places in 1985, and declared a National Historic Landmark in 1989. In 1997 the National Park Service acquired a tract of 360 acres (150 ha) which encompasses the site of the mound complex and the site believed to be that of Tonti's 1686 outpost. It is now administered as part of the Arkansas Post National Memorial, whose main site is 5 miles (8.0 km) (but 25 miles (40 km) by road) from the mound site.

== See also ==
- Hodges House (Bismarck, Arkansas)
- List of sites and peoples visited by the Hernando de Soto Expedition
- History of the Tunica people
- List of National Historic Landmarks in Arkansas
- National Register of Historic Places listings in Arkansas County, Arkansas
