= Mississippian period (archaeology) =

Cultural period in parts of the US (1000 CE – 1500 CE)

Mississippian Period
- c. AD 1000 – c. AD 1600
- Woodland Period
- Late Woodland Period
- Early modern period
- Mississippian shatter zone
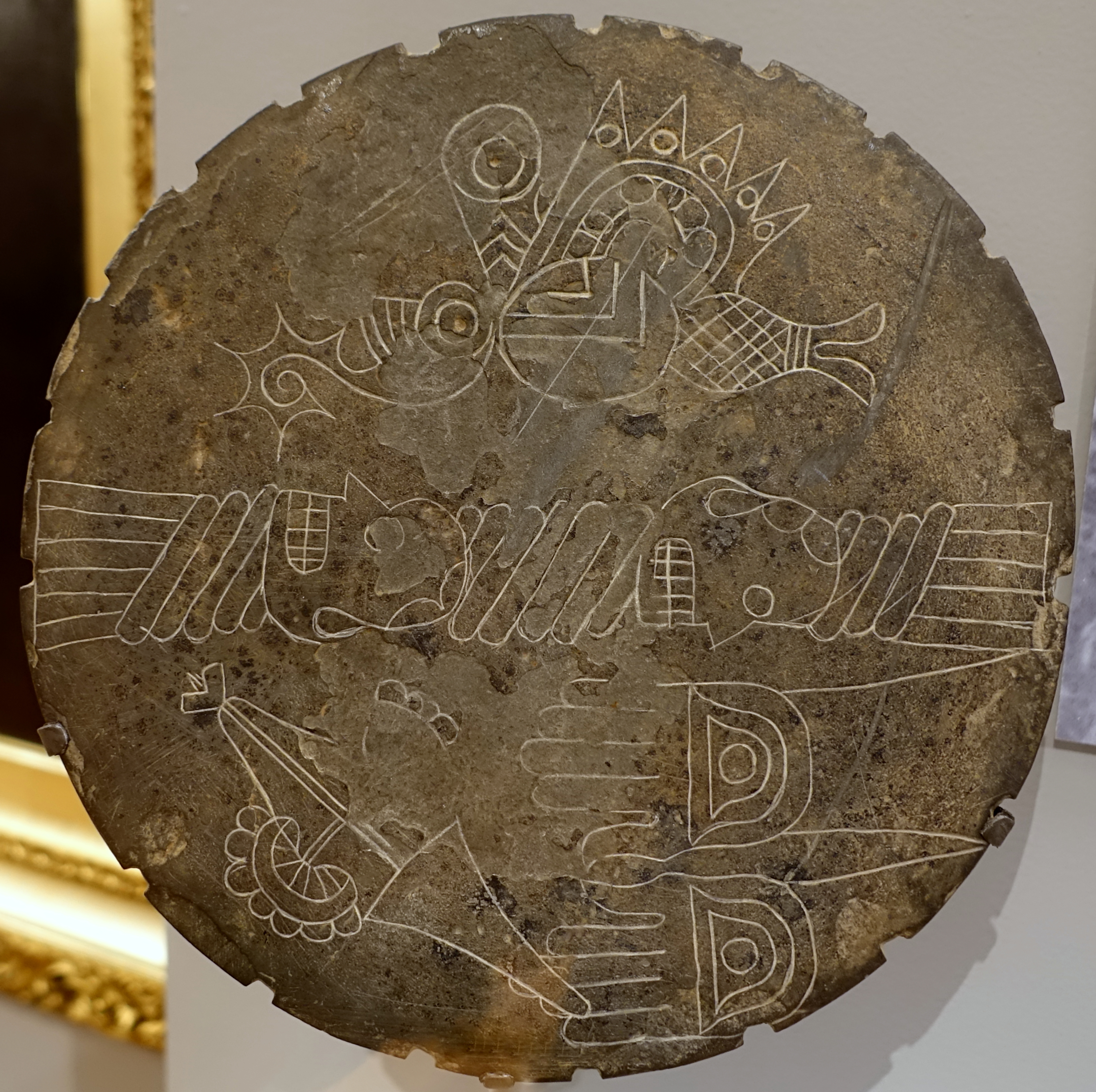
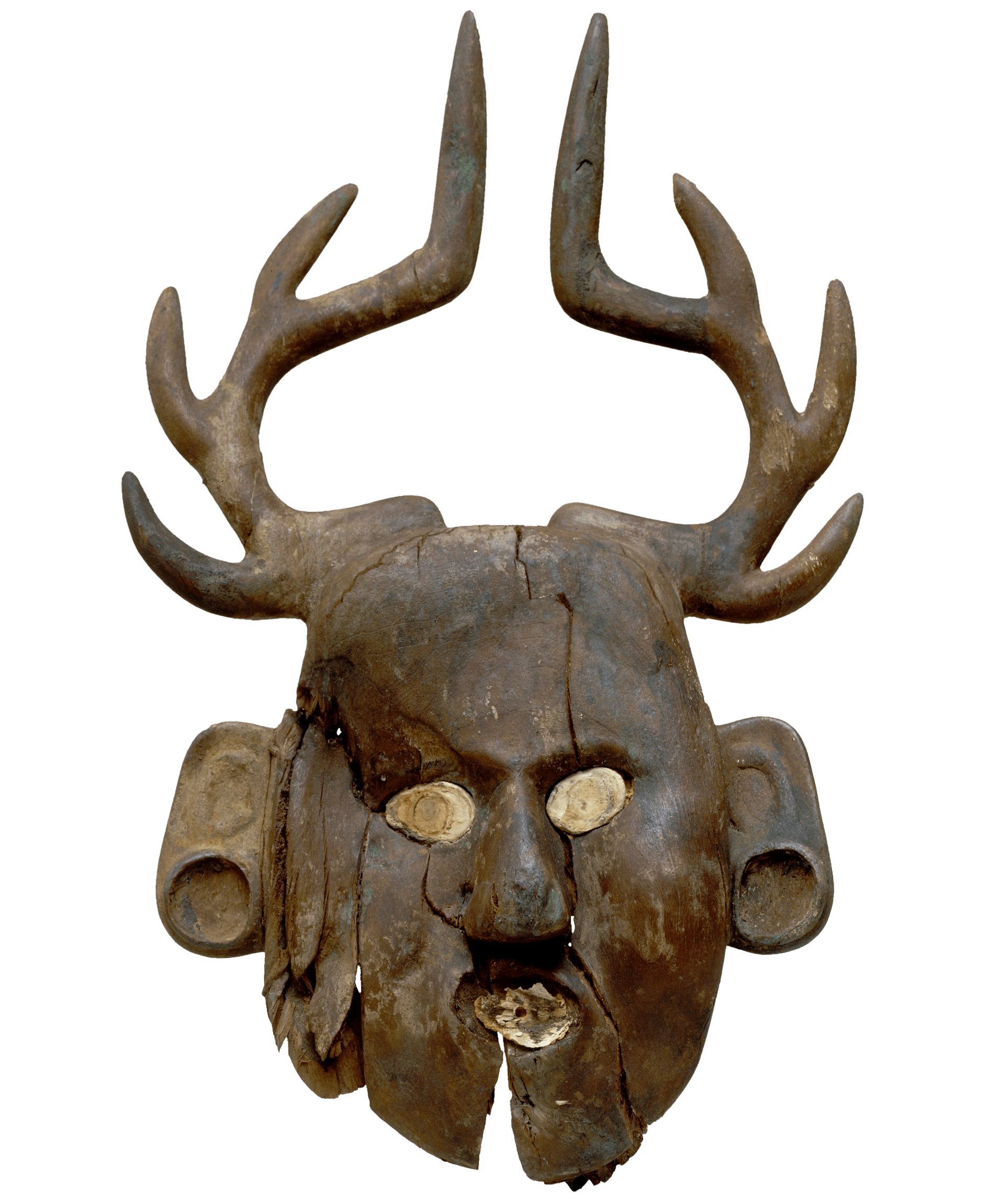
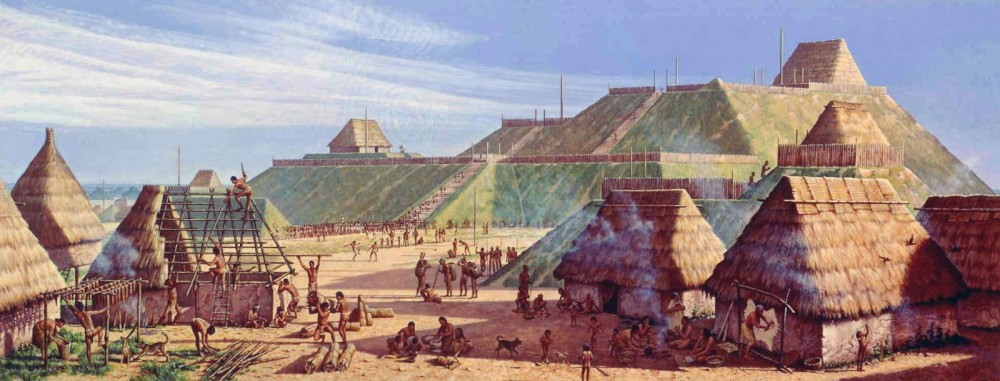
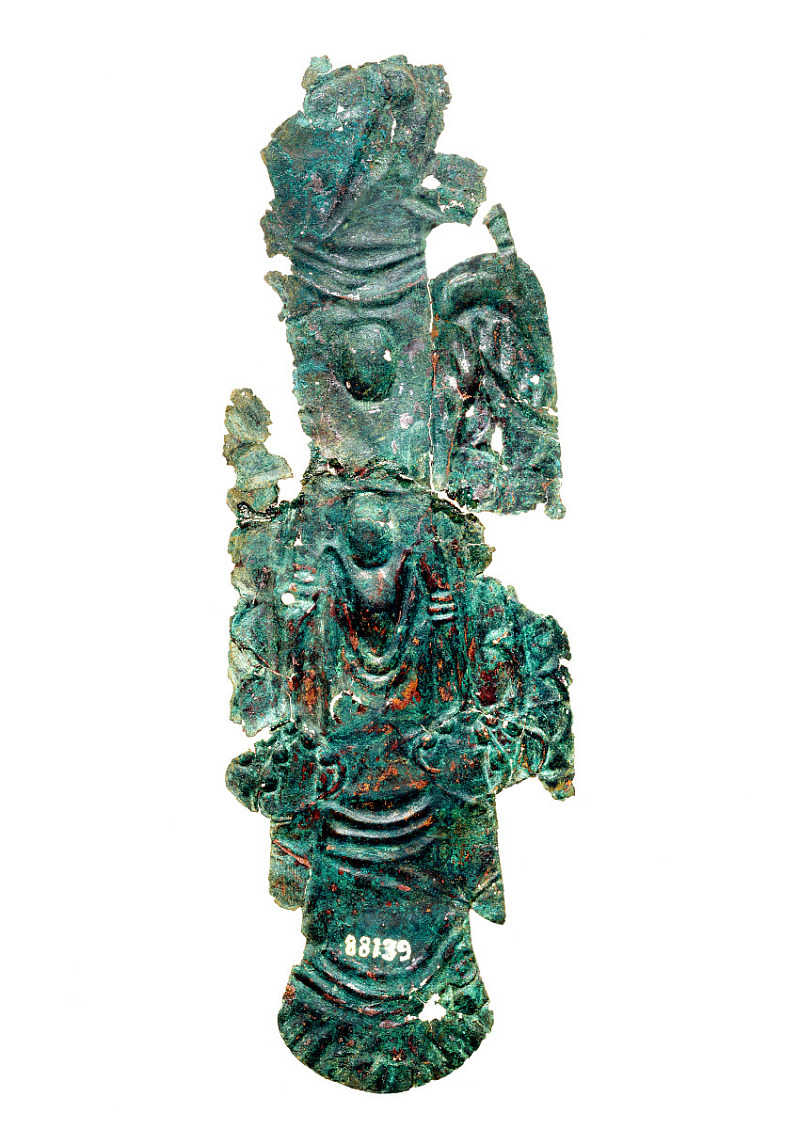
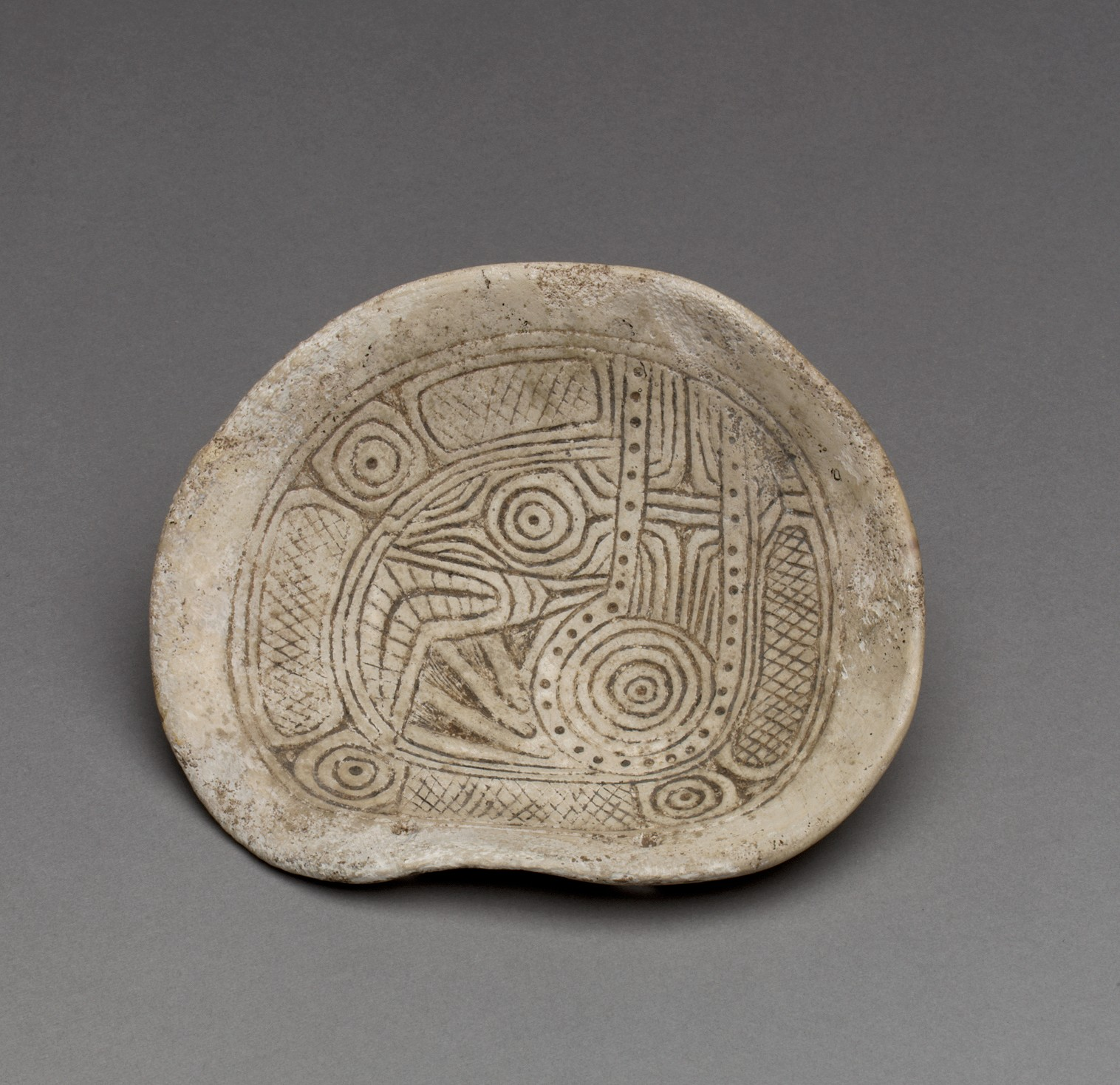
- The Willoughby Disc from Moundville, Alabama Wooden mask with deer antlers from Spiro, Oklahoma Depiction of Cahokia Copper headdress found at Upper Bluff Lake, Illinois Citico Gorget from the Coosa Paramountcy in the Appalachian Mountains
- Duration: c. 600 years
- Location: Eastern Woodlands
- Including: Early Mississippian Period; Middle Mississippian Period; Late Mississippi Period
- Leader(s): Tuskaloosa, The Lady of Cofitachequi, Zamumo
- Key events: Spread of the Corn-Mother Religion; Cahokian Big Bang; Cofitachequi-Ocute War; Datura Ritual Complex; Rise of the Southeastern Longbow; De Soto Expedition

The Mississippian period is an archaeological cultural era in the history of the Southern United States and adjacent areas of the Eastern Woodlands spanning the end of the 10th century to the 16th century. It was preceded by the Late Woodland period and succeeded by the colonial-era Mississippian shatter zone. Mississippian peoples lived in large villages and characteristically fed themselves with a diverse agricultural system centered on maize agriculture. This stood in contrast to the peoples of the preceding Woodland period, who primarily used Eastern Agricultural Complex crops, and whose mound-building activities were more limited to burial mounds. The Mississippian period is itself subdivided into the Early, Middle and Late Mississippian periods.

Although there were substantial changes in society and political structures, Mississippians had strong cultural continuity with their Woodland ancestors. Despite the emphasis on maize, the old Eastern Agricultural Complex crops remained in use by Mississippians. The flat-topped platform mound, once thought to be a uniquely Mississippian trait, has been found to have its origins as far back as the Archaic period, although summit structures still appear to be a more typically Mississippian occurrence. Most Mississippians retained the Hopewell clan system, where each clan functioned like a ritual society rather than solely kin groups, and travelers were able to obtain hospitality from a fellow clan member thousands of miles from their original home.

Founded in 1050, the city of Cahokia likely had a population of at least 22,400 at its peak around 1124. Archaeologists believe it to be a planned social and religious project, with towering mounds built by a mix of Caddoan, Natchezan, Muskogean, and Dhegiha Siouan peoples. Between 1050 and 1150, the Cahokians briefly established a series of missionary outposts as far as 500 miles north of Cahokia. Despite its failure and rejection by the local woodland population in the north, other Cahokian projects seem to have greater success, like Angel Mounds, which may have been used as a pilgrimage site for Cahokians. The end of the Medieval Climate Anomaly (around 900 to the early 1100s), and the start of a decades long drought (1150–1200) in Illinois brought political instability to the region.

Cahokia experienced decline and outmigration as a result. Many Mississippian mound centers outside Cahokian influence began to rise in prestige, like Moundville in Alabama, the Yazoo basin in Mississippi, and the Oconee basin in Georgia. As the elite of these mound sites drew in more and more exotic trade goods, the Mississippian world experienced religious and cultural changes. In some areas, a Datura Ritual Complex became more popular.

The Late Mississippian period (1400–1600) was marked by less elaborate, but territorially larger paramount chiefdoms. These various paramountcies functioned less like the Middle Mississippian complex-chiefdoms, with a powerful center and a less powerful periphery, but more as a confederation of various mound sites headed by a paramount, a primus inter pares known as the "Gran Cacique" by Spanish settlers. Many settlements nucleated, increased defenses with larger defenses, and furthered development of archery technology. Entire river basins, like the Savannah River, were transformed into 'Vacant Quarters'; sparsely settled buffer zones that lay between growing paramount chiefdoms.

== History ==
=== Emergent Mississippian/Terminal Late Woodland (c. 900 – c. 1000) ===
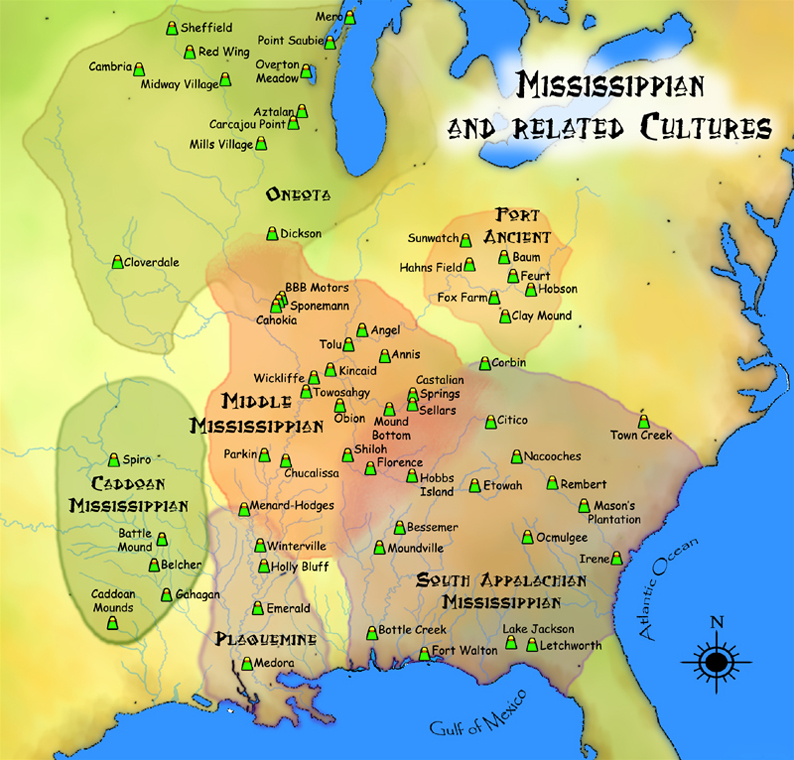
A map showing the various Mississippian cultures, as well as the influenced Fort Ancient and Oneota

The Mississippian peoples had their origins in preceding Woodland groups, in some cases inheriting the Hopewell clan system, Hopewell units of measurement, as well as reusing some Hopewell period mound centers. The Post-Hopewell Late Woodland Period was characterized by the use of new bow and arrow technology, an uptick in maize consumption, elaboration of platform mound construction, and new forms of political organization. The latter half of this period, between 900 AD and 1000 AD, is known as the transitioned to the Emergent Mississippian or Terminal Late Woodland period. Although the Emergent Mississippian period continued much of the same trends as the Late Woodland period, this period is noteworthy for beginning to build summit structures on platform mounds, beginning production of shell-tempered pottery, and growing trade networks across the Mississippian world. The Emergent Mississippian/Terminal Late Woodland is categorized as distinct from the rest of the Late Woodland also because of the growth of Cahokia during this period.

=== Early Mississippian period (c. 1000 – c. 1200) ===
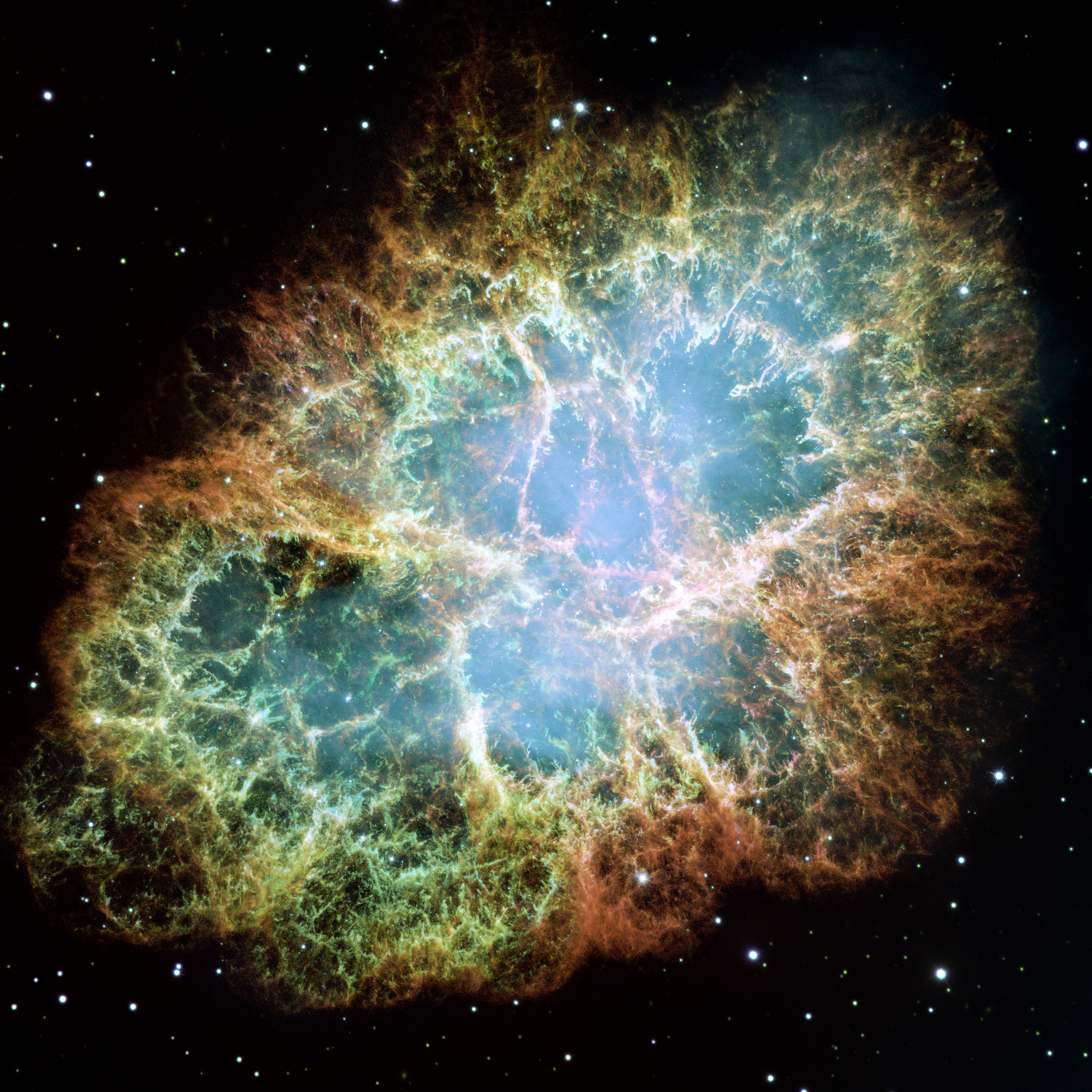
SN 1054, an event that may have triggered the founding of Cahokia

The Early Mississippian period was principally characterized by the growth and apex of city of Cahokia. Including downtown Cahokia near Collinsville, as well as the East St. Louis precinct, this urban center likely peaked in population and power around 1124 with at least 22,400 people, and possibly a few thousand more in St. Louis. Construction primarily occurred during the Edelhardt phase (1000–1050) and Lohmann phase (1050–1100). Archaeologists believe it to be a planned social and religious project, involving towering earthen pyramids built by a mix of Caddoan, Natchezan, Muskogean, and Dhegiha Siouan peoples. It was perhaps related to astronomical events like Halley's Comet or SN 1054.

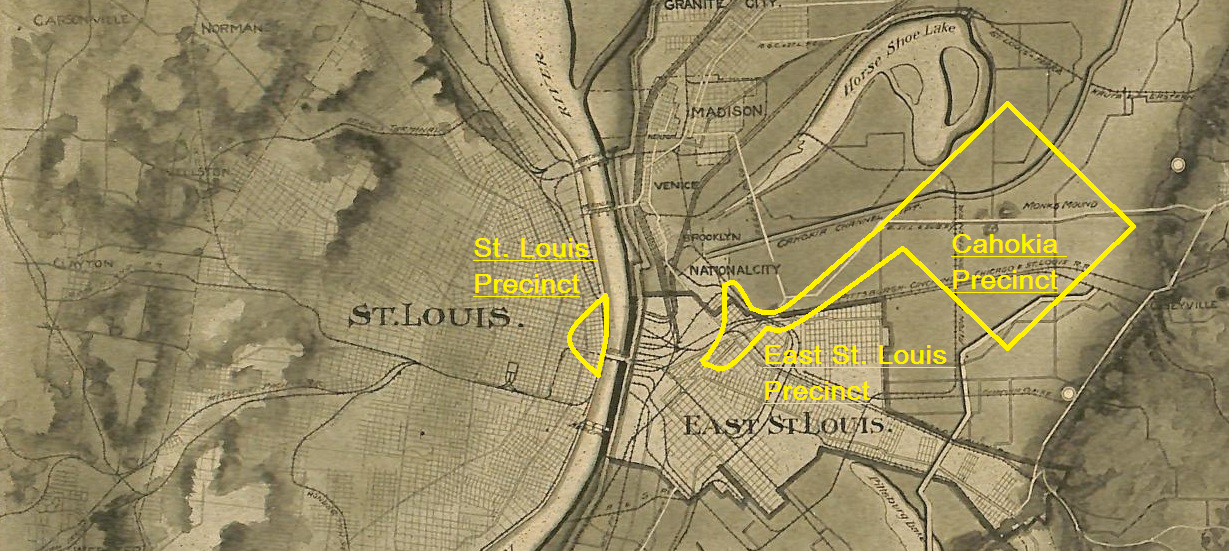
Map with the approximately borders of the three precincts of Cahokia

Between 1050 and 1100, Cahokians also briefly established a series of missionary outposts in the Midwest as far as 900 kilometres (560 mi) to the north, like Trempealeau Mounds, Aztalan, and the Apple River valley. There have been various theories for these various regions on why Cahokians came and were allowed to stay in these regions. For Cahokians, their principal reasons were likely centered around spreading their way of life and religion, as well as certain natural geography that affirmed their religion. For the native woodlanders, embracing Cahokian way of life was for alliance purposes, access to resources, and to support a growing elite group centered based on new sacred objects. Despite the abandonment of these initial outposts, later Cahokian projects seem to have greater success, like in the Central Illinois River Valley, whose ruling elite are thought to have come from Cahokia. or Angel Mounds, thought to be reliant on Cahokia and founded in part by Cahokians (or at least Angel priests educated in Cahokia).

Towards the end of the 11th century, expansion also began southward. Notable examples include the Carson Mounds site, believed to be a Cahokian exclave, as well as the mounds at Lake Providence, Louisiana, which may have had Cahokian residents. This expansion was interrupted however, by a new crisis in the Midwest, one that would eventually spell the end of Cahokian hegemony. The end of the Medieval Climate Anomaly had triggered the start of a dry spell in Illinois, with two droughts occurring between 1150 and 1200, and a third around 1275, bringing much political instability to the region. This instability resulted in a serious exodus of Central Mississippians to regions that previously held links with Cahokia, like the Nashville area, where immigration hit its peak around 1275. Several thousand fled eastward, along the Ohio River. Although this migration was principally to Mississippian mound centers like Prather and Angel, several Early Fort Ancient (1000–1300) sites appears to have had a disproportionately high amount of non-local remains during this time period as well, with possible origins in parts of Tennessee or the Central Mississippi valley. Such sites include Turpin and State Line, as well as Guard, Schomaker, and Horseshoe Johnson. Several groups of Central Mississippian travelers may have migrated to Georgia, moving into the Macon Plateau after 1100, as well as causing the Nashville Mississippians to migrate in numbers to Etowah. Most of these Cahokian "diaspora" groups were likely families returning to their ancestral lands after staying in Cahokia for several generations, as opposed to invading migrants.

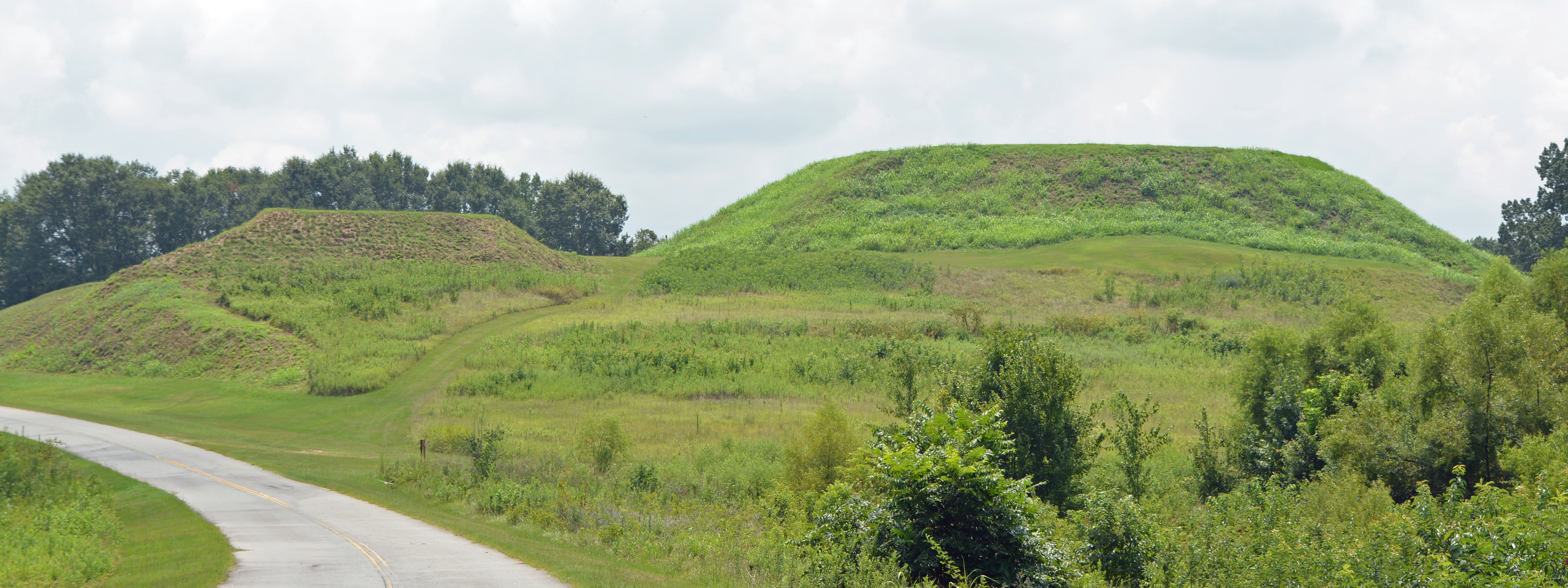
The Great Temple Mound (right) and the Lesser Mound (left)

Although undoubtedly an important site, Cahokia wasn't the only Early Mississippian community. Several other Mississippian sites emerged across the Southeast independent of Cahokia. The Shiloh Indian Mounds Site along the Tennessee River played an important role in Mississippian history. Shiloh and the Tennessee River Mississippians had a relationship with later eastern centers including Moundville on the Black Warrior River, Bessemer Mounds near modern Birmingham, Cedar Creek on the Alabama River, as well as several mounds on the Chattahoochee River. In the Appalachian Mountains, there are several Cherokee mounds that date to the Early Mississippian period, such as Kituwa and Nikwasi. These Cherokee sites, as well as neighboring Early Mississippian mounded centers in Atlanta, Eastern Tennessee, and South Carolina were the Mississippian pioneers in the South Appalachia region with strong roots from preceding Woodland period polities, such as those of the Woodstock in northern Georgia and the builders of the Kolomoki Mounds.

=== Middle Mississippian period (c. 1200 – c. 1400) ===
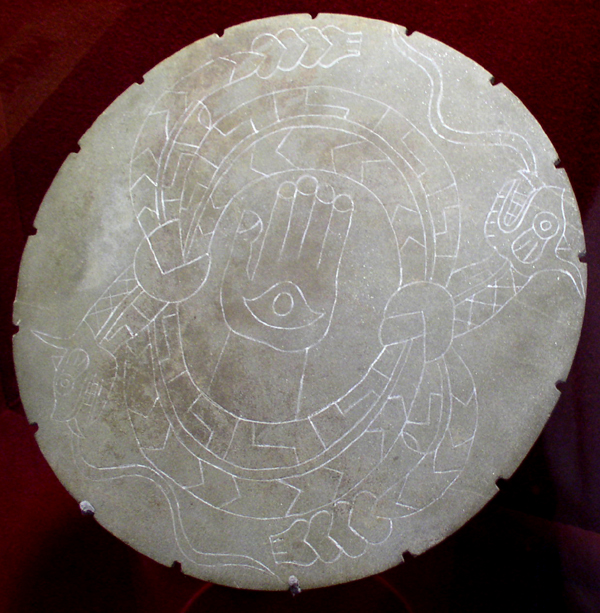
Stone pallette with S.E.C.C. motifs from the Moundville Site in Moundville Alabama

The waning of Cahokian dominance created a mild power vacuum in the Mississippian world, giving rise to the Middle Mississippian period; a multipolar Mississippian world dominated by many polities competing and collaborating with each other to obtain prestige goods. In the later years, the rising power of Kincaid Mounds eclipsed Cahokia as the dominant power in the middle Mississippian region during and after the decline of Cahokia.

In Alabama there was Moundville. A monumental center of arts and earthen architecture during this period, Moundville saw its peak in population around 1200, the culmination of population movements from the countryside beginning c. 1120. Around the same time, large monuments sprang up all over the nearby Yazoo River, a new manifestation of the Mississippian way of life known as the Plaquemine culture. Allies of Moundville, the largest sites of this region include Holly Bluff, Winterville, and Emerald mound sites, the latter having the tallest Mississippian mound after Cahokia (if one were to count the secondary mound on top of the base mound).

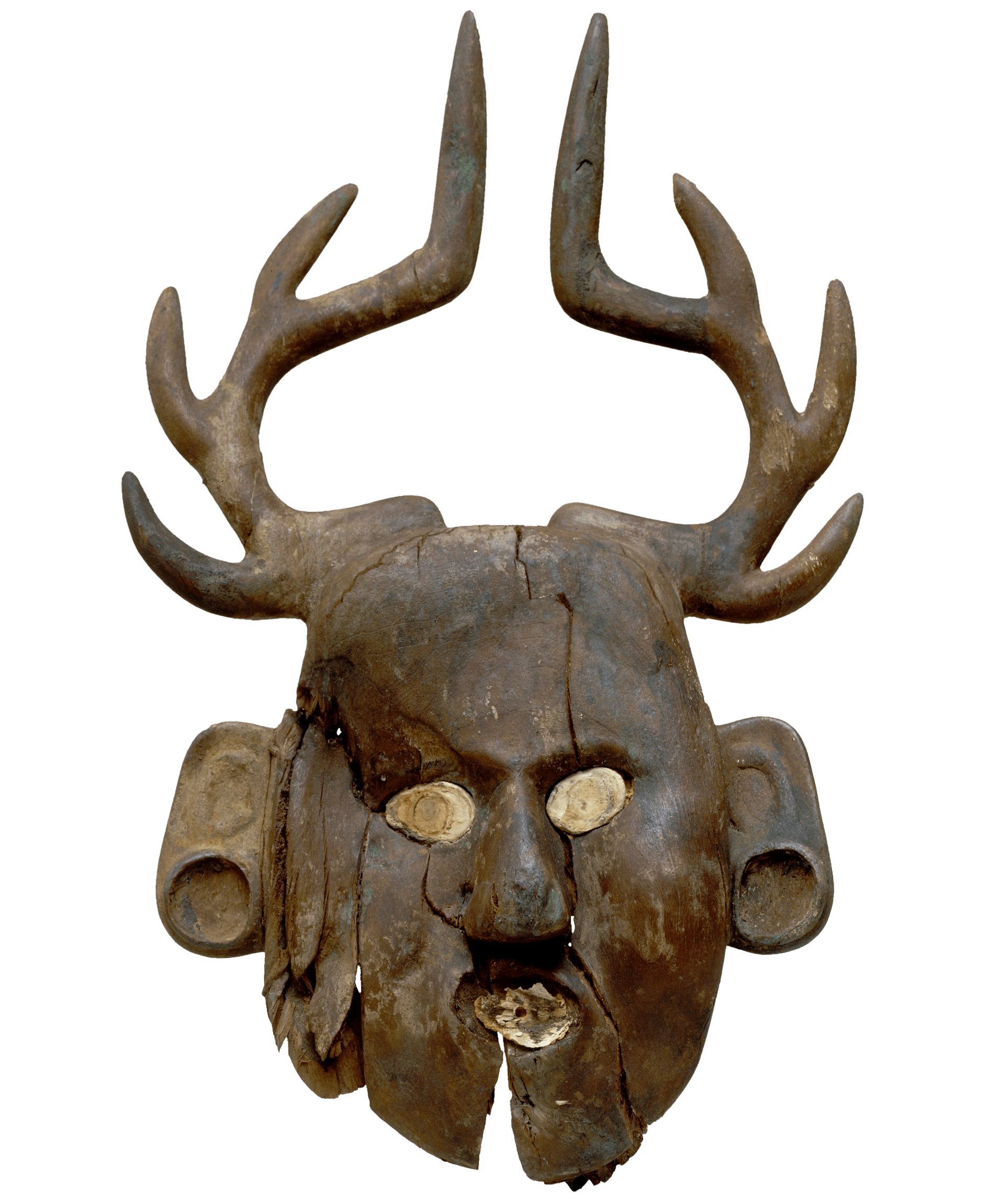
Human face effigy with deer antlers is a Mississippian Wood artwork created between 1200 and 1450.

Several centers with links to Cahokia also grew in power. Located on the southern edge of the Appalachian Mountains, the chiefdom of Itaba built the tallest single temple mound after Cahokia in its namesake capital of Etowah, and became the leading regional hegemon. Itaba's prominence and grandeur may have forced an alliance against Etowah, between the Koasati and Coosa polities to the north, paving the way for Itaba's eventual collapse. At the northern edge of the American Southeast and east of the region controlled by Kincaid lay Angel Mounds, capital of the Angel phase communities. With clear ties to Cahokia, the religious leaders at Angel grew a vast network of hinterland sites across western Kentucky, peaking in the early 14th century. In Tallahassee, an area with a long tradition of platform mound construction dating before the Mississippian period, the Apalachee constructed the Okeeheepkee Mounds, likely with some influence from Cahokian inspirations.

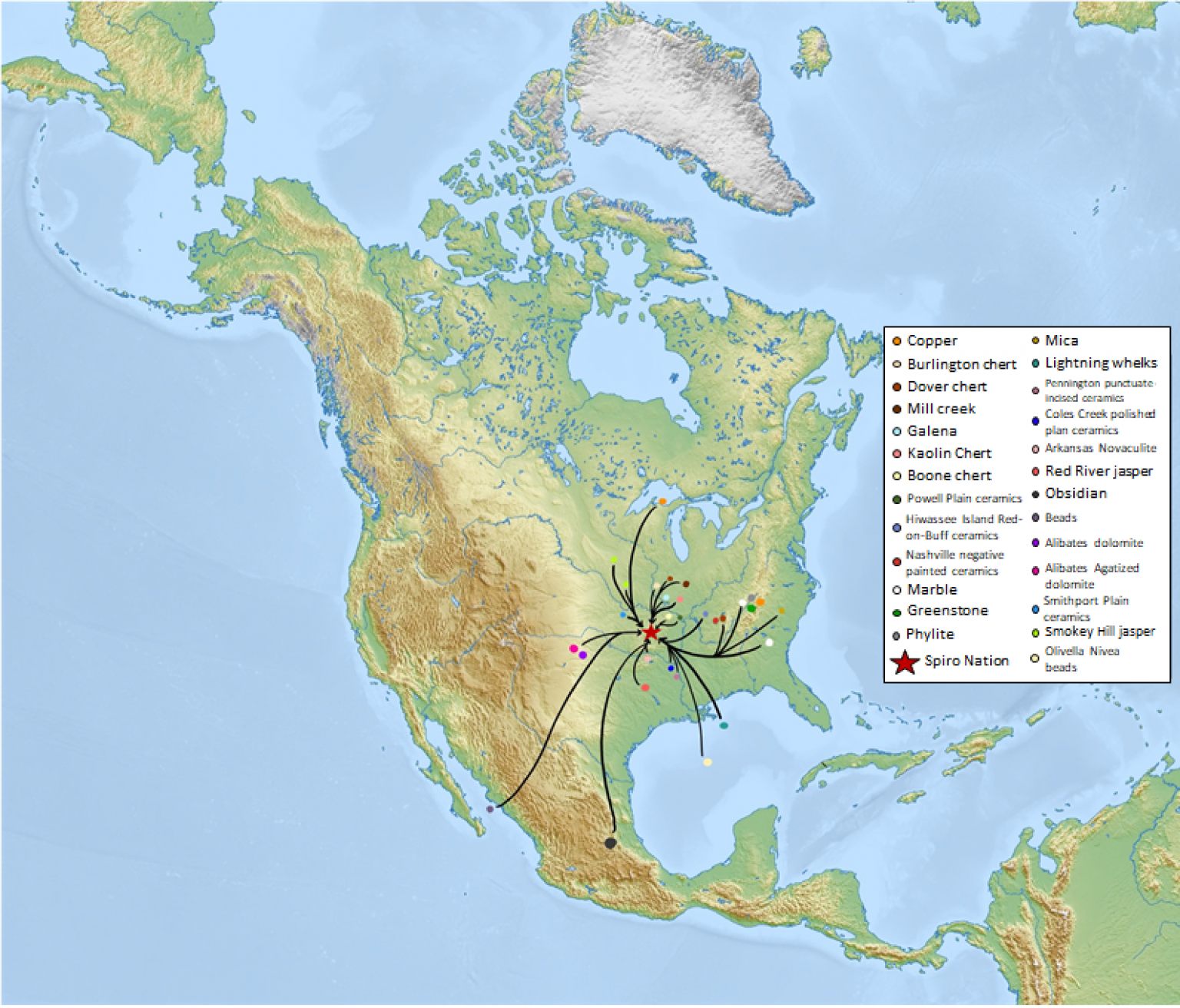
Map of the points of origin of artifacts found at the Spiro Mound

On the western edge of the American South lay the Caddoan Mississippians, the Mississippian period descendants of the Fourche Maline culture. Heavily involved with the development of Cahokia, the Caddoans also constructed numerous mound sites of their own, like Spiro and the Battle Mound Site,in the Arkansas River Valley and the Red River Valley respectively. A center for world renewal ritualism, Spiro became a center for prestige goods coming from all over the Mississippian world, reaching gatherings of up to 10,000 people. The religious elite at Spiro erected a vast network of Sprioan 'monasteries', spanning over a hundred miles; missionary outposts for some sort of Spiro gospel. The climate in this area was drier than areas in the eastern woodlands, hindering maize production, and the lower population on the plains to the west may have meant fewer neighboring competing chiefdoms to contend with. The sites generally lacked wooden palisade fortifications often found in the major Middle Mississippian towns.

Archaeological evidence has led to a scholarly consensus that the cultural continuity is unbroken from prehistory to the present, and that the Caddo and related Caddo language speakers in prehistoric times and at first European contact are the direct ancestors of the modern Caddo Nation of Oklahoma.

As the elite of these various polities drew in more and more exotic trade goods from farther and farther places, the Mississippian world saw an influx of religious concepts from the west and south in the middle of this period, including the Datura Ritual Complex, based around the consumption of Datura deliriants by the religious elite. Because the Central Mississippi River valley was located closer to these trade routes, the old rituals derived from Cahokia likely declined in favor of new central Mississippian rituals. By 1300, nucleated ceremonial capitals like Moundville had declined substantially in residential population in favor of the elite. The capital districts became limited to the elite, used for their rituals and ceremonies. These ceremonies involved intricate works of art like Etowah's copper plates and Moundville's stone palettes, and likely forms of ceremonial music as recorded by historic descendants like the Osage.

=== Late Mississippian period (c. 1400 – c. 1600) ===
The Late Mississippian period was marked by less elaborate, but territorially larger paramount chiefdoms. These paramountcies functioned less like the Middle Mississippian complex-chiefdoms, which had a powerful center and a less powerful periphery, but more as a confederation of many chiefdoms headed by a paramount, a primus inter pares known as the "Gran Cacique" by Spanish conquistadors. Several Mississippian states rose in political power, like the Cofitachequi in South Carolina, the Chiscas in Virginia, the aforementioned Apalachee in Florida, and the Ocute in Georgia. These developments were likely related to two factors; the Little Ice Age, and the introduction of the new Nodena Point arrow type.

The Little Ice Age caused instability in the maize growing Southeast, resulting in the development of the Nodena Arrow Point and the powerful southeastern longbow. Many settlements nucleated and increased defenses with larger palisades and moats, accompanied by the rise of a new warrior system based on merit. Entire river basins, like the Savannah River, were transformed into 'Vacant Quarters'; unsettled buffer zones that lay between growing paramount chiefdoms. Several Mississippian paramountcies rose in political power, like the Cofitachequi in South Carolina, the aforementioned Apalachee in Florida, the Ocute in Georgia, and Coosa in the Appalachian mountains.

=== Contact with Europeans (1540–1730) ===
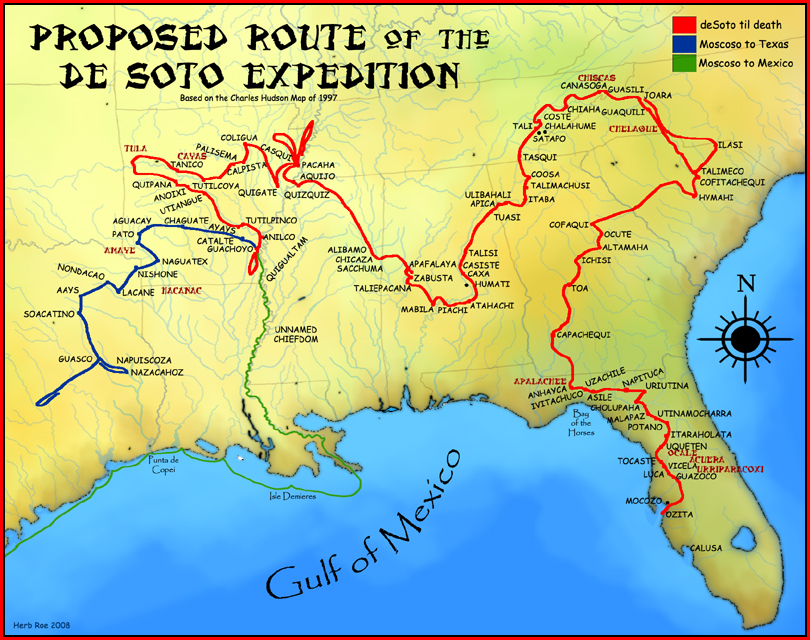
A map showing the de Soto route through the Southeast

Scholars have studied the records of Hernando de Soto's expedition of 1539–1543 to learn of his contacts with Mississippians, as he traveled through their villages of the Southeast. He visited many villages, in some cases staying for a month or longer. The list of sites and peoples visited by the Hernando de Soto Expedition chronicles those villages. Some encounters were violent, while others were relatively peaceful. In some cases, de Soto seems to have been used as a tool or ally in long-standing native feuds. In one example, de Soto negotiated a truce between the Pacaha and the Casqui.

De Soto's later encounters left about half of the Spaniards and perhaps many hundreds of Native Americans dead. The chronicles of de Soto are among the first documents written about Mississippian peoples and are an invaluable source of information on their cultural practices. The chronicles of the Narváez expedition were written before the de Soto expedition; the Narváez expedition informed the Court of de Soto about the New World.

After the destruction and flight of the de Soto expedition, the Mississippian peoples continued their way of life with little direct European influence. Indirectly, however, European introductions dramatically changed these native societies. Because the natives lacked immunity to infectious diseases unknowingly carried by the Europeans, such as measles and smallpox, epidemics caused so many fatalities that they undermined the social order of many chiefdoms. Some groups adopted European horses and changed to nomadism. Political structures collapsed in many places.

When these epidemics started to appear is not fully clear however. While researchers like Henry Dobyns and others argue that diseases spread rapidly from early Spanish contact and perhaps even earlier through trade paths from Mexico others have criticized this point, such as David Henige, arguing it exaggerates the spread of illness. Notably, the expeditions carried out by de Soto and later others like Tristán de Luna y Arellano (1559–1561) involved the Spanish camping for weeks and months in some locations and no reports of outbreak of illness among the natives in the vicinity were written by the chroniclers. Some of the Spanish had gotten sick during these expeditions but only after already traveling for many months. Natives located in the more interior regions of the Southeast might've not experienced epidemics brought by European contact until the late seventeenth century, as more current research suggests.

At Joara, near Morganton, North Carolina, Native Americans of the Mississippian culture interacted with Spanish colonizers of the Juan Pardo expedition, who built a base there in 1567 called Fort San Juan. Expedition documentation and archaeological evidence of the fort and Native American culture both exist. The soldiers were at the fort about 18 months (1567–1568) before the natives killed them and destroyed the fort. (They killed soldiers stationed at five other forts as well; only one man of 120 survived.) Sixteenth-century Spanish artifacts have been recovered from the site, marking the first European colonization in the interior of what became the United States.

By the time more documentary accounts were being written, the Mississippian way of life had changed irrevocably. Some groups maintained an oral tradition link to their mound-building past, such as the late 19th-century Cherokee. Other Native American groups, having migrated many hundreds of miles and lost their elders to diseases, did not know their ancestors had built the mounds dotting the landscape. This contributed to the myth of the Mound Builders as a people distinct from Native Americans, which was rigorously debunked by Cyrus Thomas in 1894.

== Society ==
=== Religious Organization ===
Developing from Woodland shamans, powerful clan priesthoods or similar organizations has been speculated to exist all over the Mississippian world. During the Mississippian period, political dominance in the towns shifted between powerful priests and civic town leaders depending on the time and region. No matter the region, organizations who drew their legitimacy from the supernatural remained prominent throughout the time period, often being the principal force behind the massive monumental projects that the Mississippians are known for today.

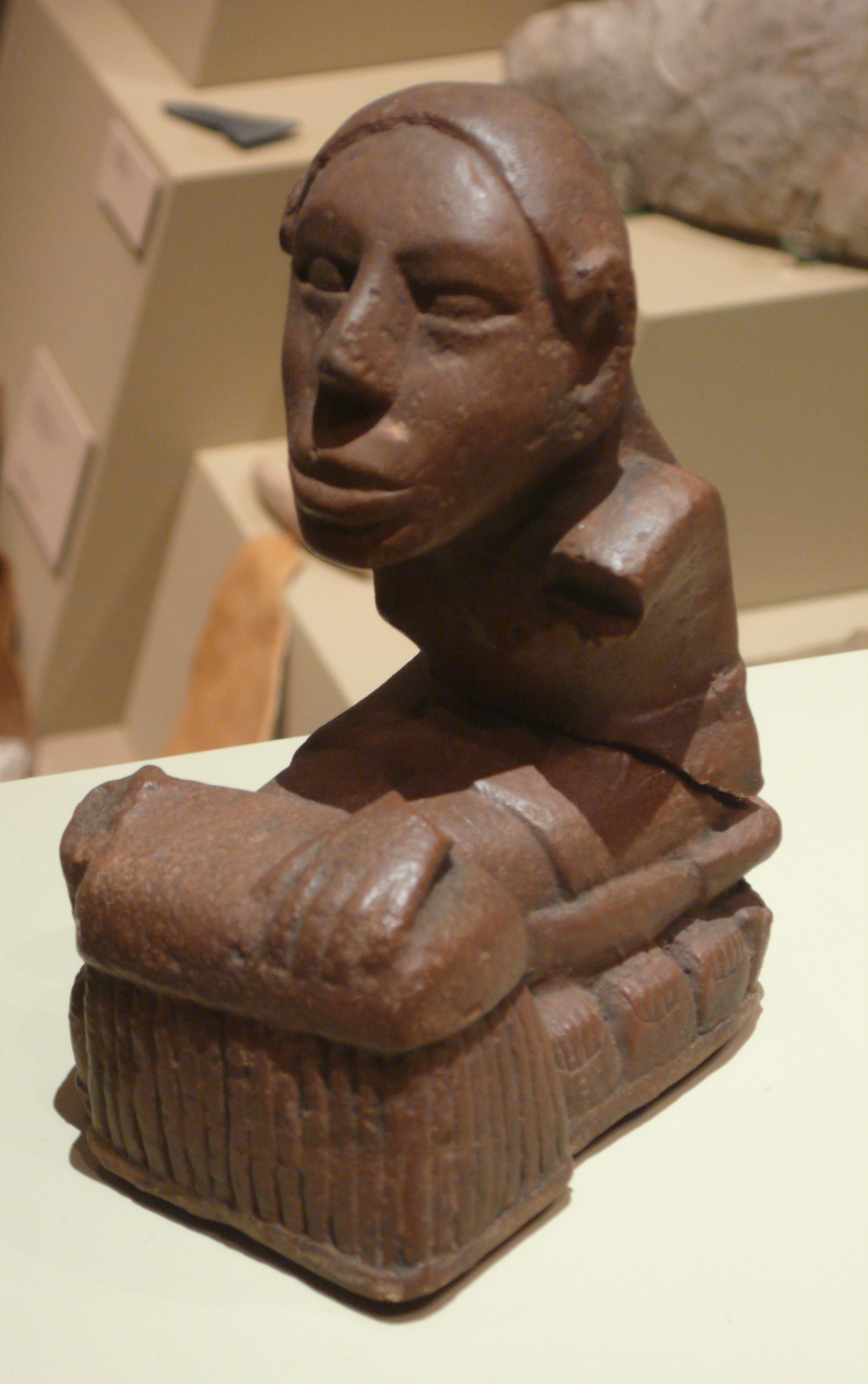
Keller figurine, thought to be a depiction of "The Weaver", a priestly position among the Osage

==== Osage Clan Priests ====
The role of Osage clan priesthoods involved power in military initiatives, certain positions in government, and management of hunting expeditions. several sacred bundles, sacred pipes (Wa-wathon), and management of hunting expeditions. Ceremonially, the priesthoods also held control of the supernatural forces, certain rites and songs. Several positions existed within the priesthood like the Sho’-ka (priestly messenger) and the Xo’-ka (a spirit sponsor; someone who takes on various spirits' personas). In theory, anyone could rise through the ranks through divine fate, gaining additional ritual knowledge and powers each time. In reality it costed various insider initiation rituals, the gifting of goods, and sponsorship by the Xo’-ka.

Such clan priesthoods have not only been compared to clay figurines at Cahokia, but also to the Moundville mound layout, suggested to represent the clans and their clan priesthoods. This layout may be similar to the Osage system of government, where the main government was the "House of Mysteries", or a coalition of 21 gentes or clans split into 3 divisions, with each clan having its own ranked set of 7 priesthoods.

==== Plaquemine Suns ====
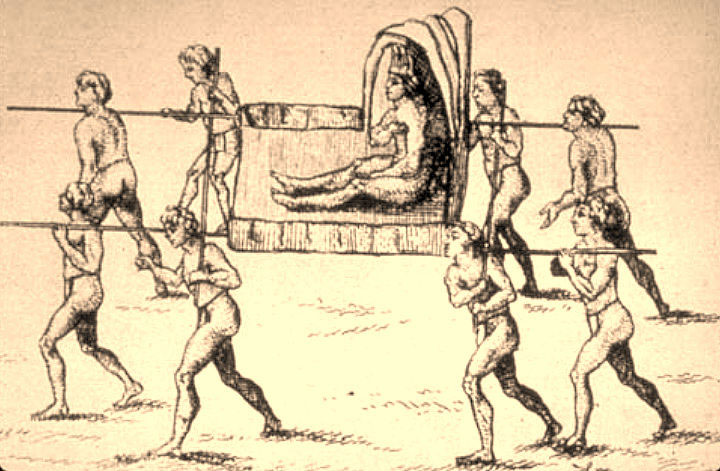
The Natchez Sun being carried around on their litter by several Honored men

Plaquemine culture groups like the Natchez, Avoyel, Taensa, and Chitimacha had their own form of priestly organization. Though the Natchez and the Chitimacha records don't have any evidence of a unique clan system like much of the Southeast, what was recorded was a system in which the majority Stinkards venerated the upper classes and supplied them with resources and obedience. The upper classes were composed of the Honored men (Stinkards who had been promoted by the Suns), and above them the ruling aristocracy of Suns themselves. Although it was once thought that the Suns had to marry Stinkards and drop a rank, causing a paradox that would make the ruling class unsustainable, there are now many solutions, such as suggestions that this exogamy was only implemented to accommodate immigrants caused by colonial chaos, or simply that this exogamy was exaggerated and not as enforced as once thought. French explorer Antoine-Simon Le Page du Pratz, who lived among the Natchez for over a decade, recorded Natchez elders who claimed that the Natchezan caste system centered around the Sun clan once stretched as far north as the Wabash River and as far south as Bayou Manchac.

==== Caddoan Priesthoods ====
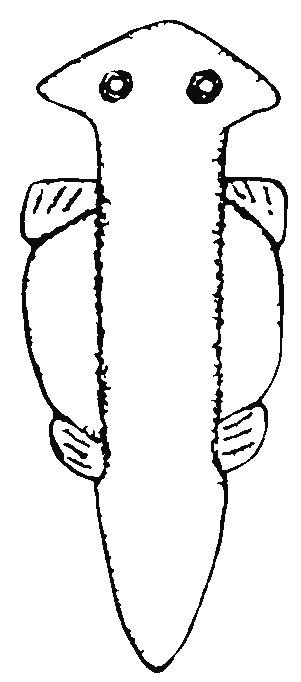
Sketch of a Beaver pendant from the Belcher Mound Site

Among the Caddoans, there were three main social classes: village leadership (the Caddi) who inherited their position, the elite who served as civil officers or lower religious leadership, and commoners. Above everyone was the Tsah Neeshi (Mr. Moon). Mr. Moon was empowered by the Moon (Neesh) and possibly a Creator (a 'a caddi qyo; Father Above Chief) which may've been the same as Moon. The wives of the Tsah Neeshi and the Caddi were referred to under the title aquidau. Among the elite, the Caddo had three kinds of doctors or shamans; the strongest one was Beaver (T'ao), the next strongest being the Oracle (Yuko) and the last called daitino or Mescal Bean doctor. These doctors and shamans would belong to an animal lodge cult, possibly related to animal spirit ancestors. The Beaver can be found in Caddoan Mississippian pendants, valued as a creature of the land and the water. There were also powerful witches, mostly men, known as naiiti, neildi’, or naite.

==== South Appalachia ====
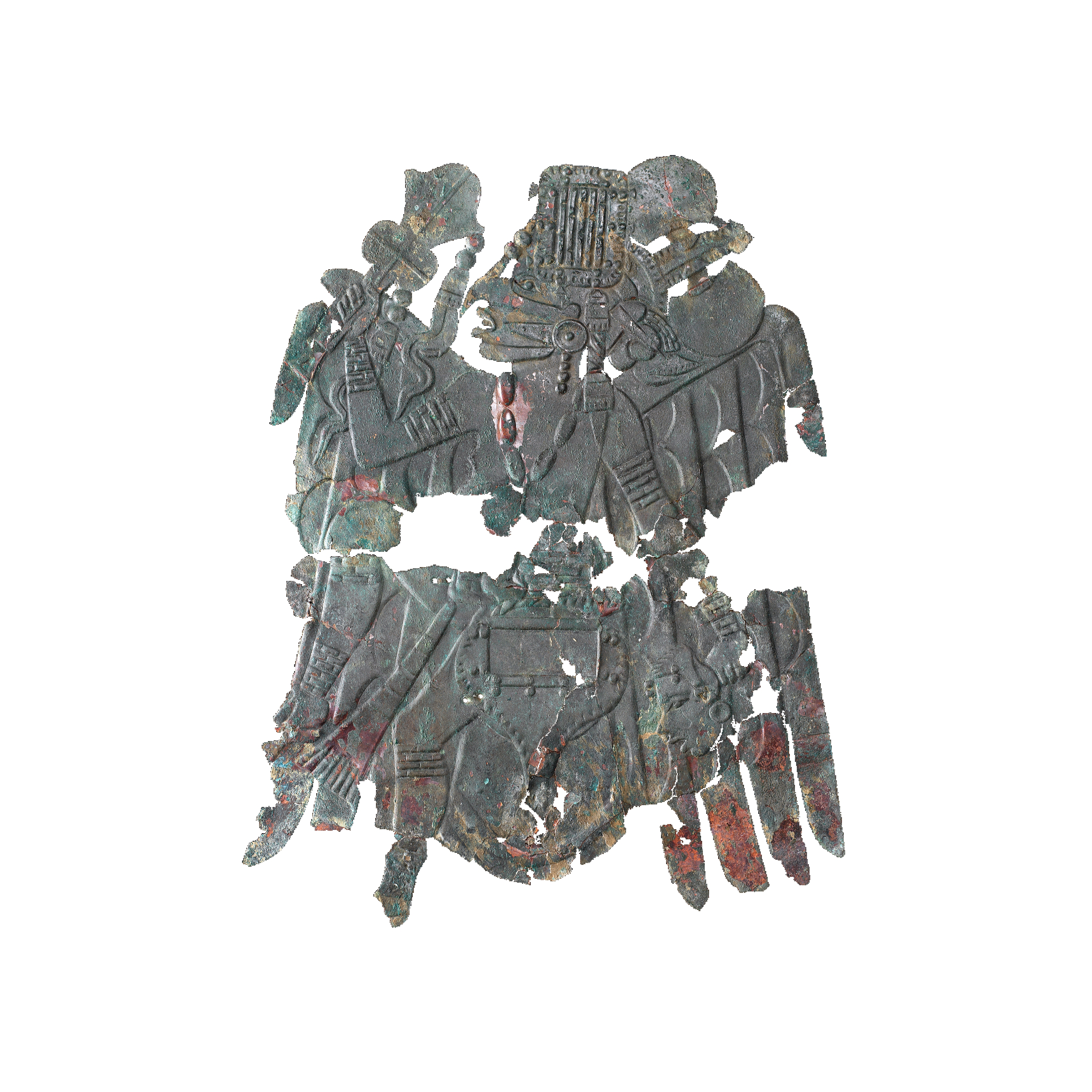
Copper plate found at Etowah Indian Mounds, likely used as a divine symbol

The Ani-Kutani were a Cherokee legend which is thought to be related to Mississippian elites. In the narrative, the Cherokee swore to never tolerate hereditary privileges again. The similarity of the word Nicotani to other entities in Southern Appalachia is noteworthy, like the Apalachee Nico (the sun), of whom the Nicoguadca is named after, and the Mico, revered 'lords' encountered by early Spanish expeditions.

=== Political Organization ===
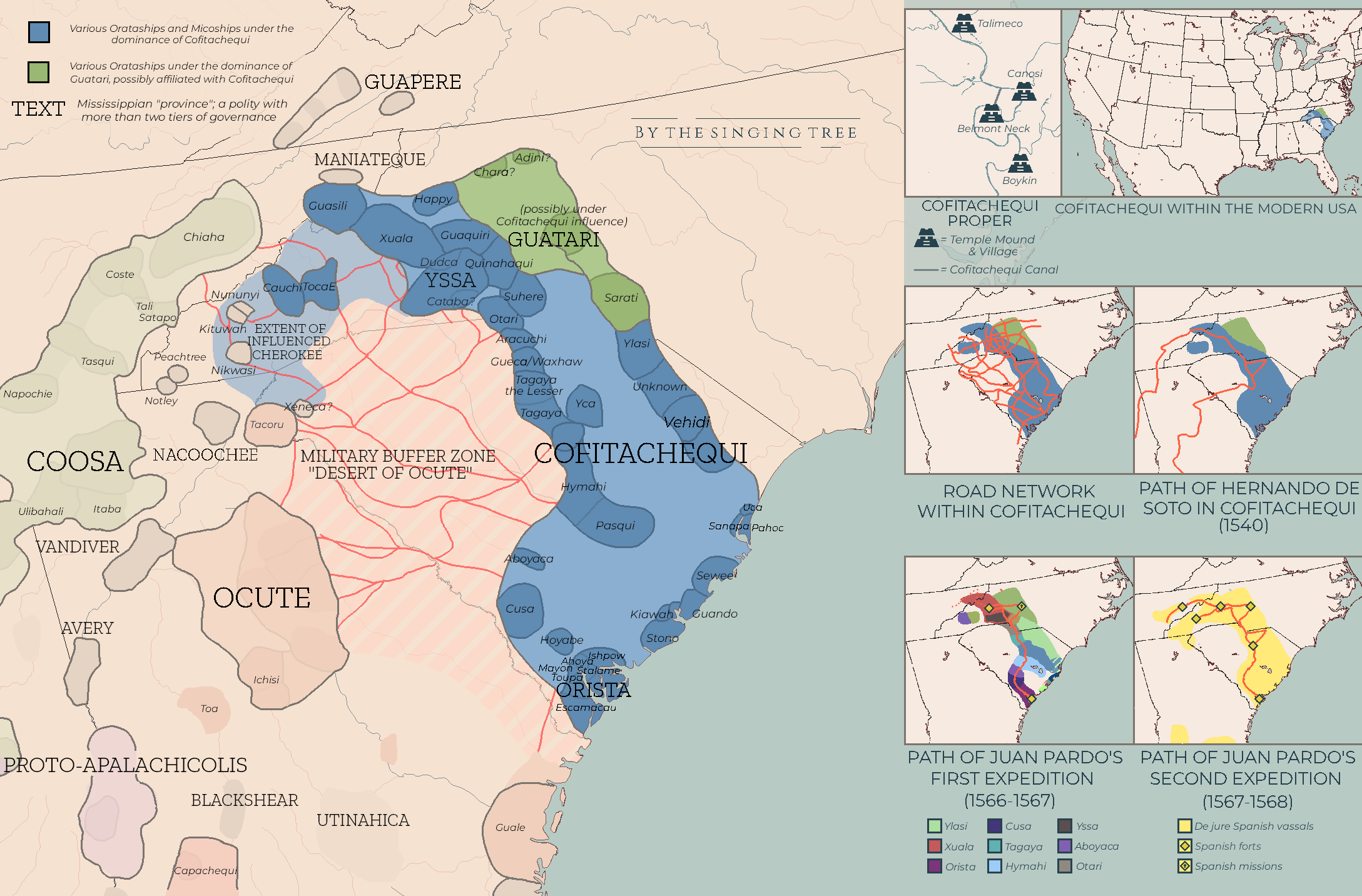
A map of Cofitachequi, a paramountcy

Although internal political organization varied from region to region, there was a common model of administration/settlement pattern, due to the limitations of walking distance. These limits (around 20 kilometers in radius), for the basic "simple-chiefdom" unit, involve the claim that the most efficient for the radius of a polity's territory to equal a half day's travel. At this distance a chief would be able to travel to the edges of his territory and back in one day, thereby possessing somewhat immediate control over the population. Not only would this distance allow administrators to efficiently travel across the territory and collect tribute, but it would also allow communities at the edges of the polity to be effectively protected by the center militarily, and for their members to travel to the administrative center for ceremonies and labor projects.

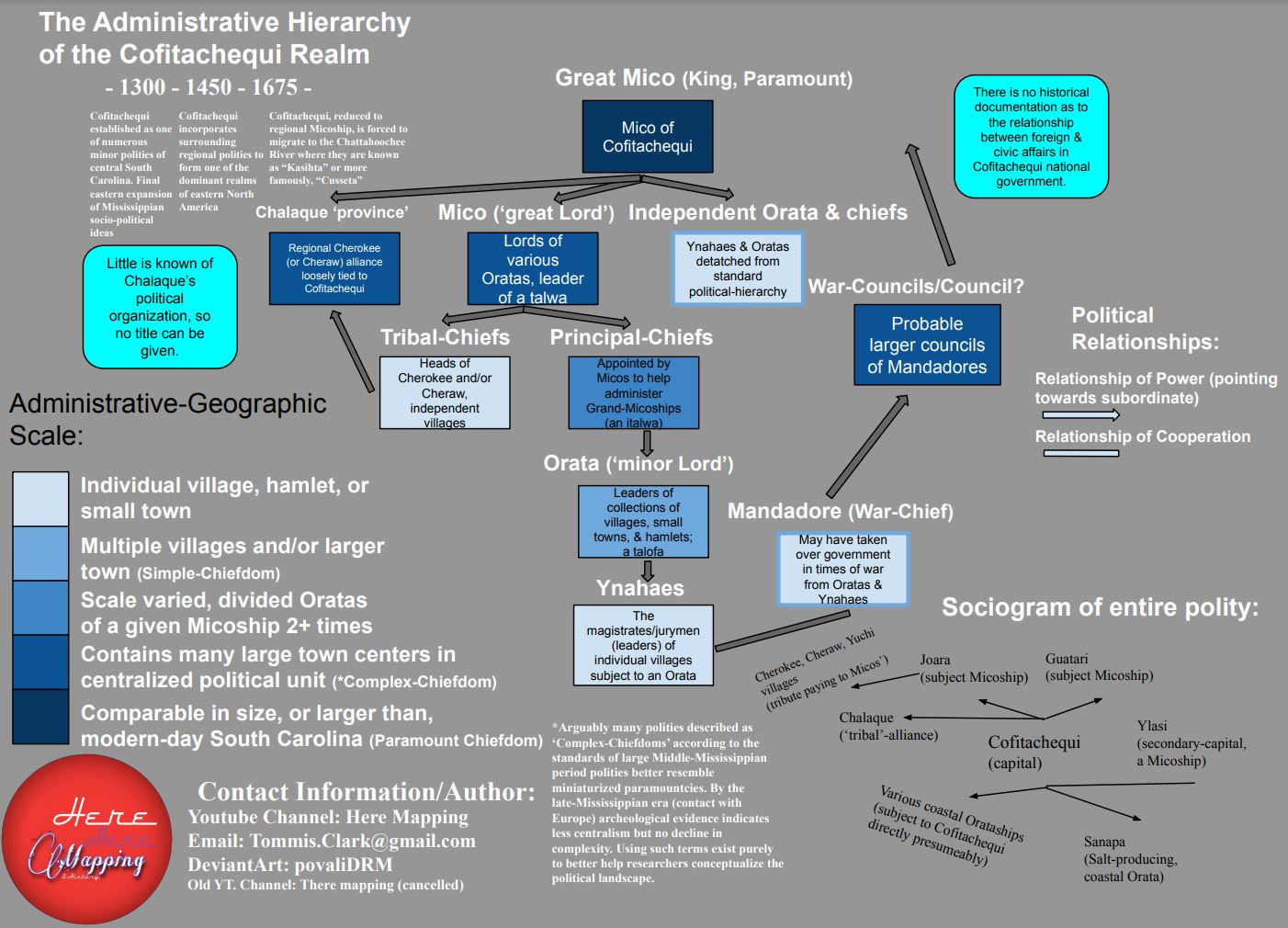
A chart showing the different levels of Cofitachequi governance and hierarchy (Great Mico being the paramount-chief, Mico meaning leaders of complex-chiefdoms, and Orata meaning leaders of simple-chiefdoms)

Above this "simple-chiefdom" unit (basically a mound site and its immediate subsidiary communities), is a "complex-chiefdom," which is simply one or two levels of administration above a simple chiefdom. Meanwhile, a paramount-chiefdom is a type of complex-chiefdom (two or three levels of administration), but rather than directly administering its subsidiaries, the paramount-chiefdom functions more like an unstable confederacy, and the "paramount chief" functioning more like a primus inter pares. This model is strikingly applicable for documented Mississippian polities in the 1500s. A good example is the polity of Cofitachequi. Its capital is the Mulberry mounds site, and the 20 km radius around Mulberry mounds can be considered the Cofitachequi simple-chiefdom. Several simple-chiefdoms around Cofitachequi, of whom directly paid tribute to Cofitachequi, can be considered part of its complex-chiefdom. When kidnapped by the Spanish, the Lady of Cofitachequi was able to guarantee safe passage and some local resources in the northern complex-chiefdom of Joara, as well as several simple chiefdoms in the Chalaque region. These simple-chiefdoms and complex-chiefdoms, though not funneling tribute directly to the capital at Mulberry mounds, is nonetheless part of Cofitachequi's broader paramount-chiefdom/confederacy.

Since the mid-20th century, Mississippian polities have been known as chiefdoms. The term chiefdom originates from the mid-20th century works of Elman Service's approach to cultural evolution. Chiefdoms were considered to be a society more complex than band or tribal level societies, but still not as developed as states. Several scholars have claimed Service's model perpetuates subtly racist ideas of the 19th century, that European-style states were superior to other forms of political organization, and that the political organizations different from Europeans were just on their way to becoming European states.

There have been numerous attempts to introduce a new term with less baggage for Mississippian polities, such as "mini-states", "civilizations", "micoships", and "kingdoms".

=== Military ===
Choctaw military hierarchy

Several Mississippian groups and Mississippian-descended groups had a meritocratic warrior system. The Apalachee for example, had scalp requirements for each rank. A man who had obtained a single scalp was a Warrior (Apalachee: Tascaia). One who had taken three scalps was a Noroco. The highest title a warrior could attain was Nicoguadca, or "lightning." Attaining this legendary title required one to have killed ten enemies, and three of these had to be high ranked warriors known as Hita Tascaia. During the contact-period Choctaw, and Muscogee, there were at least two military ranks attainable above the basic designation as Warrior (Choctaw: Nakni Taska, lit. 'male warrior; politically-dependent warrior'): The lieutenants (Choctaw: Taska Minkochi, lit. 'Chiefly Warriors'), and the majors, who also acted as masters of ceremony (Choctaw: Tishu Minko, lit. 'Assistant Chief'). All three ranks received their titles in recognition of their having performed warlike feats, the war chiefs having accomplished the most. One of the lieutenants was designated by the Beloved Men as "Great Warrior" (Creek: Tastanaigi Tako) and had the duty of leading his chiefdom in war, aided by the lieutenants. Great Warriors supposedly held immense amounts of power, but only for matters of war. When war was declared, it was announced by the Great Warrior. He also arranged with the Great Warriors of other chiefdoms to have ball games. These ball games, Toli, known as "the younger brother of war," were not just games, but had important political functions.

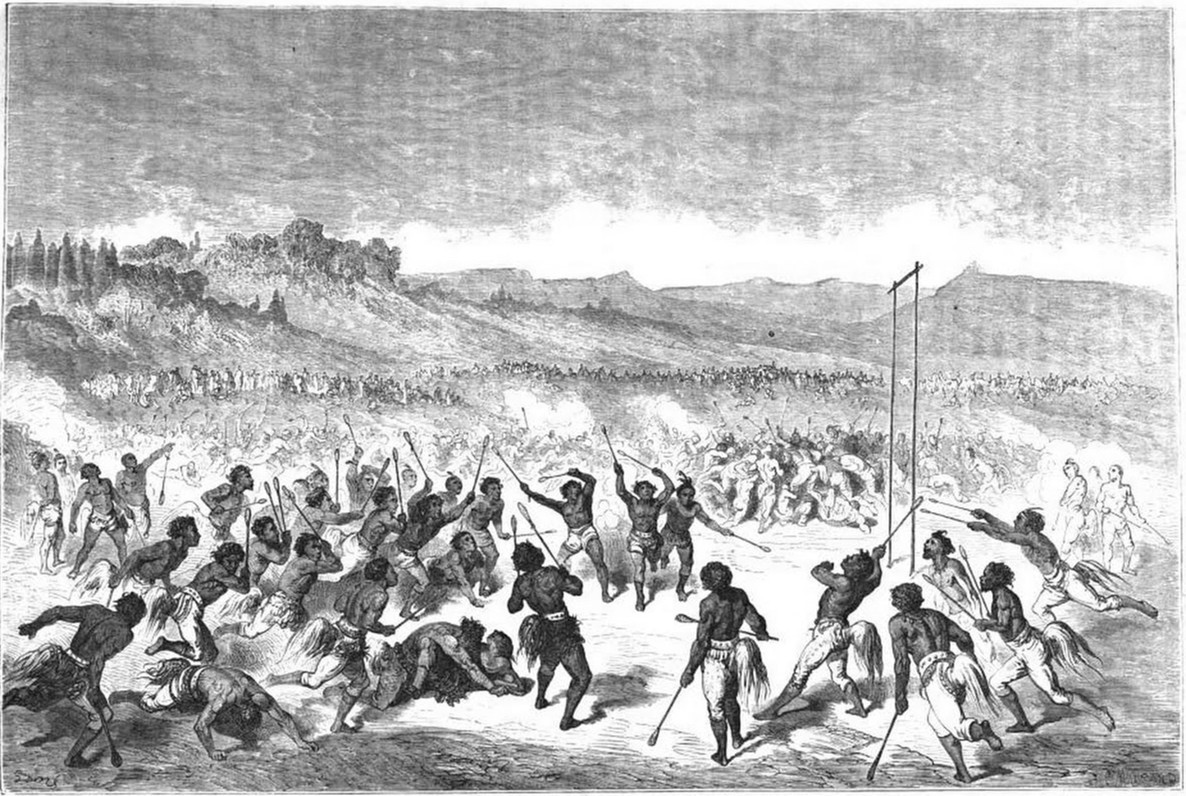
Choctaw Toli or ball game

Along with the ranks of war, there also exists the Supporting Men (Choctaw: Hatak Imatali). These are males who've not achieved any scalps or who have killed only a woman or a child. They did the menial tasks in war, like carrying equipment as porters. During the contact period, they were often elevated through participating in attacks with close relatives, who would award him some share of the scalps to improve his ranking. A raising of rank involved a naming ceremony, wherein the advancing individual is, especially in the higher ranks, awarded a war epithet. For example, Hopaii Hacho, Hopaii being the rank he's obtained (war-prophet) and Hacho being a war-related adjective, meaning mad or crazy.

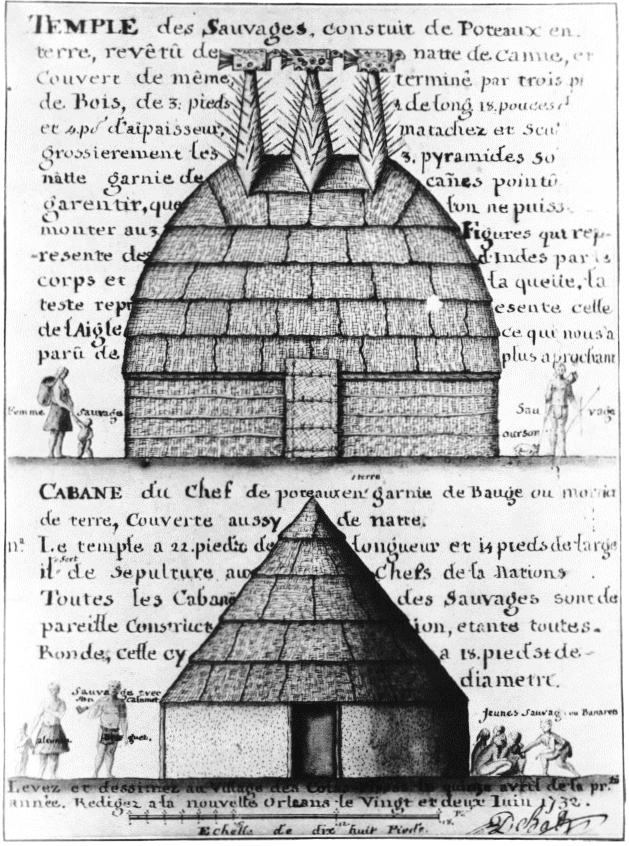
An example of what a Mississippian Temple could look like (top)

It's noteworthy that warrior rank systems likely affiliated with religious organizations throughout the Southeast. For example, in Choctaw territory there was the Unkala, a priestly order who worked as custodians of the Taskatchúka (lit. 'House of Warriors'). This temple was allegedly the oldest settlement among the Choctaws, and stood on the banks of the Cushtusia Creek in Neshoba County, Mississippi. The Clan Speakers (Choctaw: I′ksa A′numpule) prepared the bones of great warriors for burial, and the Unkala priests went at the head of the mourners to that temple, chanting hymns in an unknown tongue.

== Culture ==
=== Languages ===
The Mississippian world was incredibly multilingual. In a broad sense, Muskogean was the predominant language family in the southeast, Caddoan speakers propagated in the west, Natchezan and Tunican languages around the Mississippi River, and Siouan languages in the north. There were however, many exceptions and this distribution wasn't absolute. Siouans like the Catawba existed to the east, as well as likely many languages that simply weren't documented in the early expeditions or in oral history, which were subsequently wiped out in the centuries after contact by slave raids and disease.

Mississippian peoples communicated with each other in various ways. They may have used a trade jargon which evolved into the Mobilian Jargon known to Europeans considering factors like its distribution and its participants, though there's no way of confirming. When Hernando de Soto and other European explorers made expeditions into the Mississippian Southeast, they used a string of interpreters (Creek: Yatiki, Yuchi: Yatikˀi, lit. 'Receiver of fire') to traverse a very multilingual world. At least two of the paramount chiefdoms encountered by De Soto and Juan Pardo were multilingual, with speakers of Siouan, Iroquoian (Cherokee), and various Muskogean languages.

=== Pictograms and Narrative Art ===
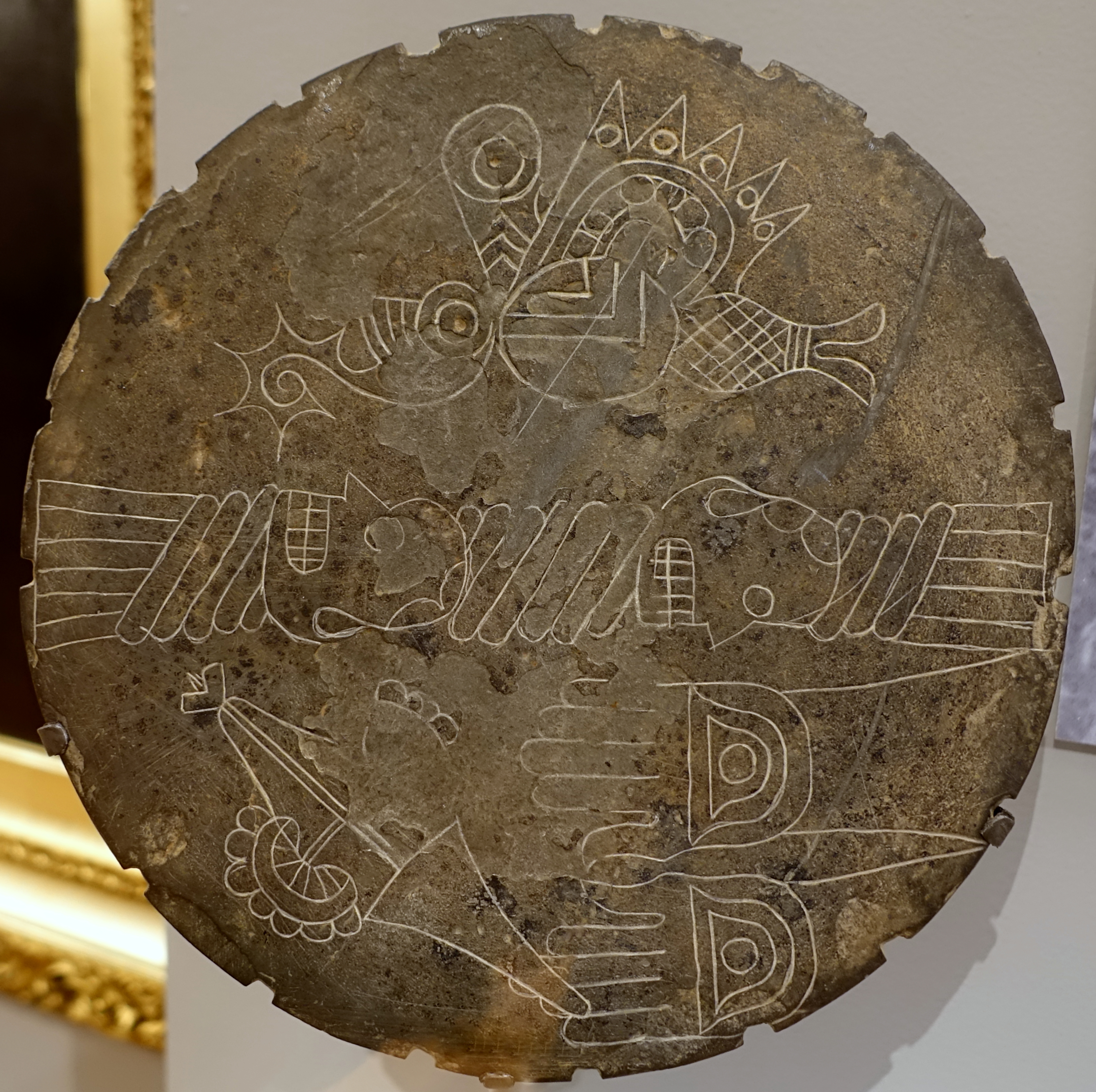
The Willoughby Disc

Although the Mississippians didn't have a system of alphabetic writing, there were numerous methods that were used to communicate ideas. One unique example of Mississippian narrative art is the Willoughby Disk, thought to describe the process for a death-related ritual. This ritual involved Datura-based substances which is represented by the Sphinx Moth, a Sacred bundle, the bilobed arrow representing the soul, and the hand-and-eye symbolizing the Milky Way or the Path of Souls. Antoine-Simon Le Page du Pratz reported a standardized method which the indigenous peoples of Louisiana 'wrote' declarations of war engraved on bark. Read from left to right, the declaration starts with the pictogram of the attacking nation, followed by a man with a tomahawk in his hand; then an arrow pointing at a woman flying away. Between the arrow and the woman is the sign of the defending nation. Below are several more pictograms representing when they would strike, the number of warriors, and insults which represent the defending nation as a fleeing woman.

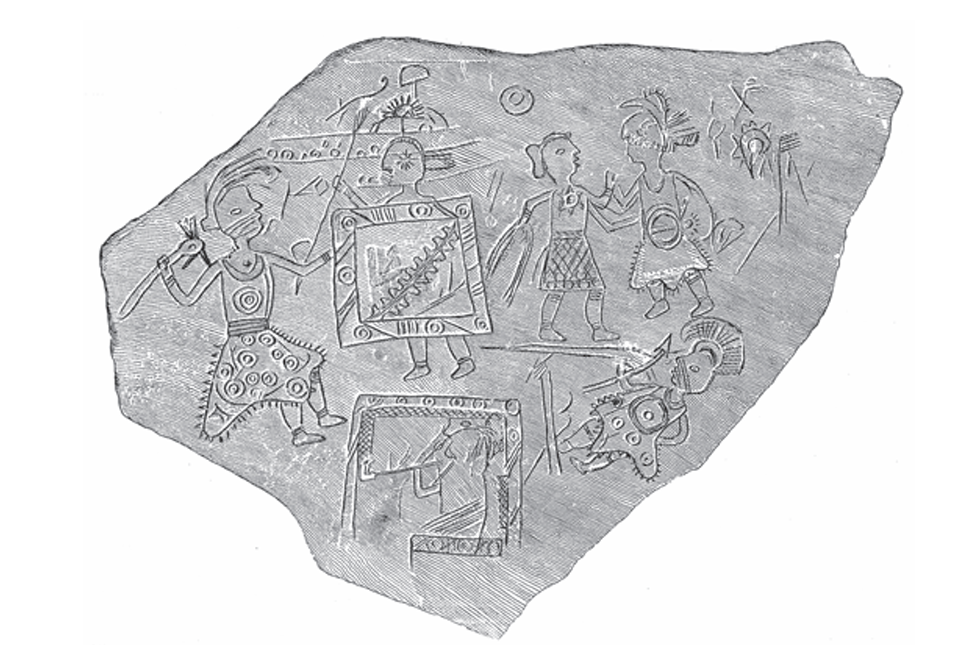
Thruston Tablet, a narration of the Hero Twins myth circa 1300

Another type of narrative art among Mississippians involved sequential pictographs. For example, the Nashville-area Thruston Tablet, created around 1400, likely narrates the tale of the Hero Twins. This tradition continued to the Historic period, though on less durable material. In 1776, Bernard Romans recorded Creek 'hieroglyphics' that narrated an ambush against the Choctaw, and William Bartram describe similar Creek 'hieroglyphics' on walls and tattooed on government officials.

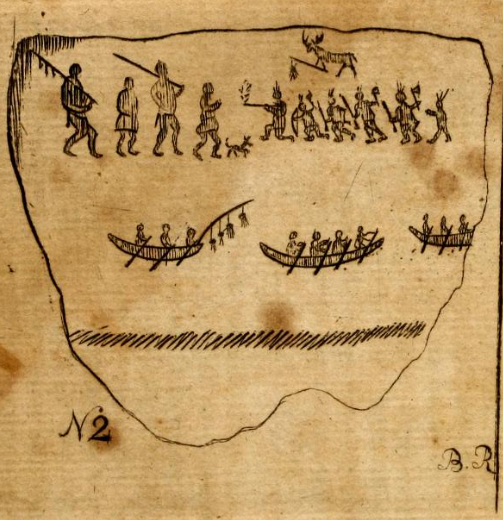
Creek 'hieroglyphics' recorded by Bernard Romans

Other examples are a little more abstract. For example, an inscribed sandstone found in the Noel Farm cemetery near Nashville by a black laborer under the employ of Gates P. Thruston, who also recovered the Thruston Tablet. The inscribed stone, though more complex, has been noted for its similarity to coal tokens found in burial mounds along the Mississippi. These coal tokens have been interpreted as currency, but there hasn't been any evidence either way, though they were certainly significant enough objects to be buried in mounds. Outside of conspiracy theories, this stone has not been interpreted since Thruston himself in the 1890s.

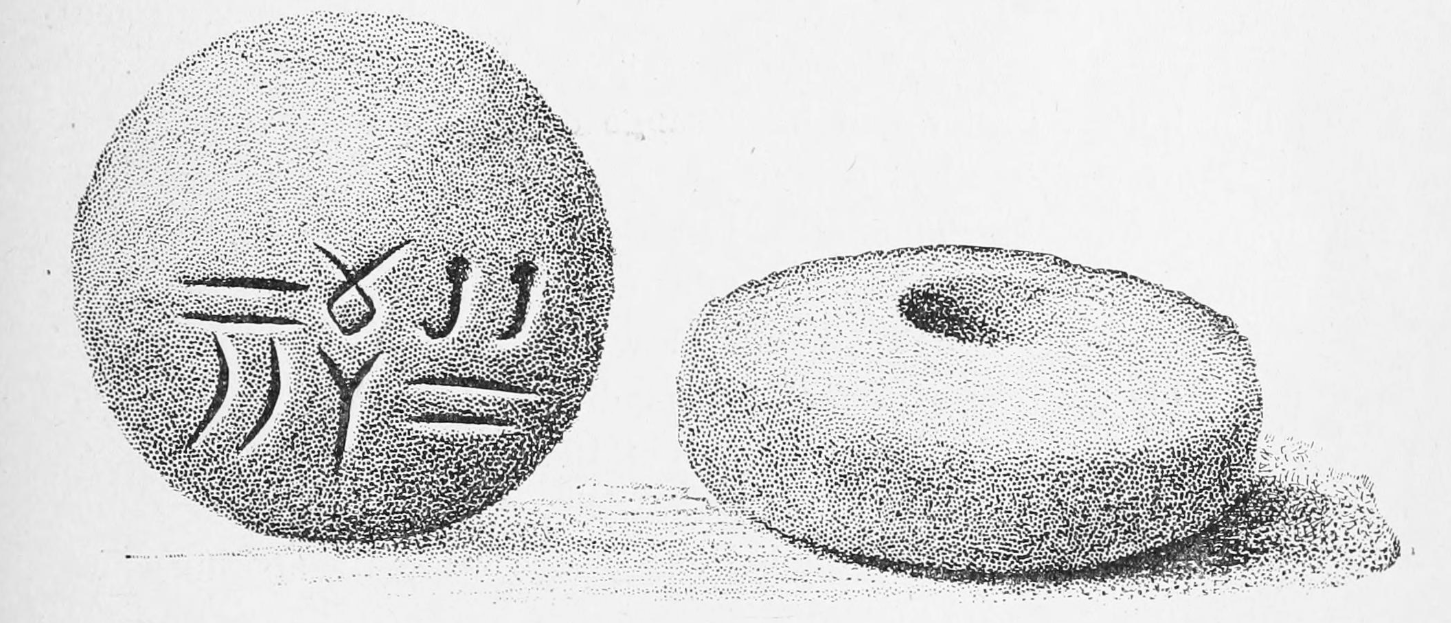
Inscribed stone found near Nashville

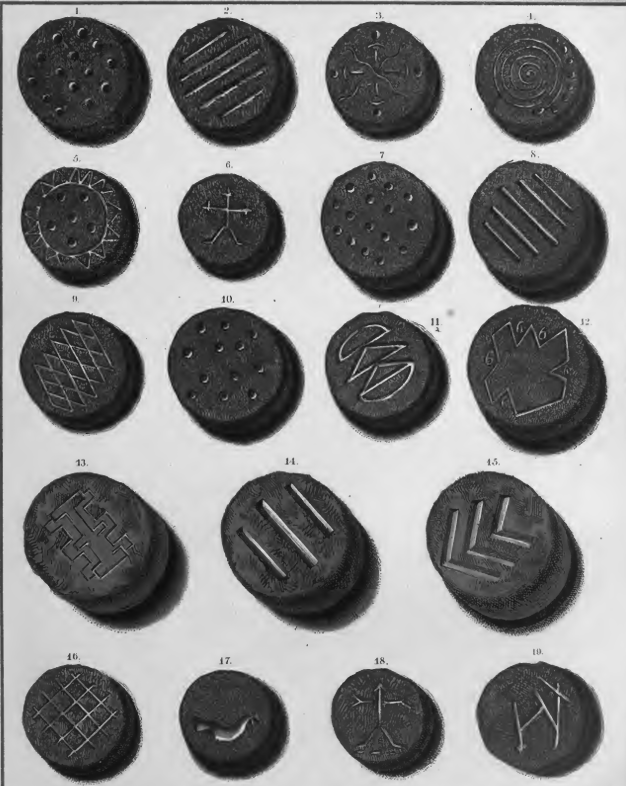
Tokens found along the Mississippi River in Burial Mounds, mostly carved on lignite or coal

==== Cartography ====
Another form of visual communication were Mississippian maps. The practice of cartography was likely very sophisticated during the Mississippian period, though we only have a handful of examples as most were drawn on perishable material like deerskin or perhaps tree bark.

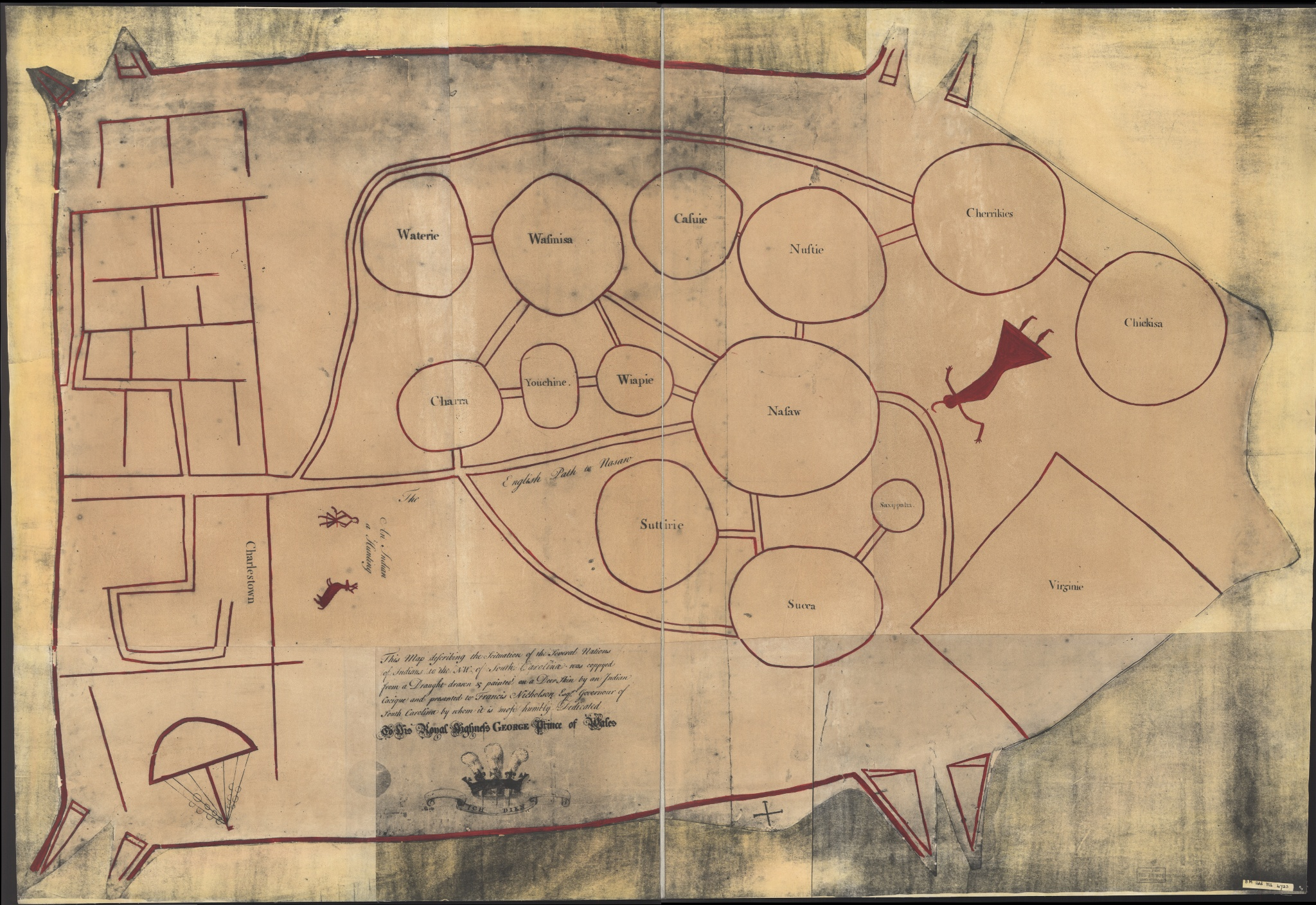
A translated copy of a Catawba deerskin map, c. 1721

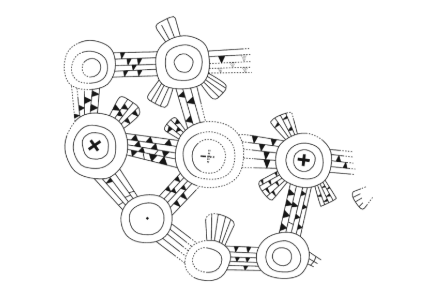
Engraved shell from Spiro c. 1400

There are two main examples of some form of cartography from the Mississippian period, each representing a different type of 'map'. One is an engraved shell from Spiro, believed to represent a sociogram map similar in style to the deerskin map gifted from a Catawba leader to South Carolina governor Francis Nicholson in 1721, as well as a Chickasaw deerskin map given to the French. These sociograms represent political connections between towns and political entities, and the paths between them. The Chickasaw Mingo explained how the visual style of the path (color, size) may represent different types of diplomatic, commercial, and military connections.

The second type is a literal map of the natural geography, exemplified by the Commerce Quarry and Petroglyph site, likely created sometime between 1200 and 1400 in the Middle Mississippian period. This petroglyphic map attempts to show several communities' literal geographic position, as well as natural features like rivers and lakes.

=== Clothing ===
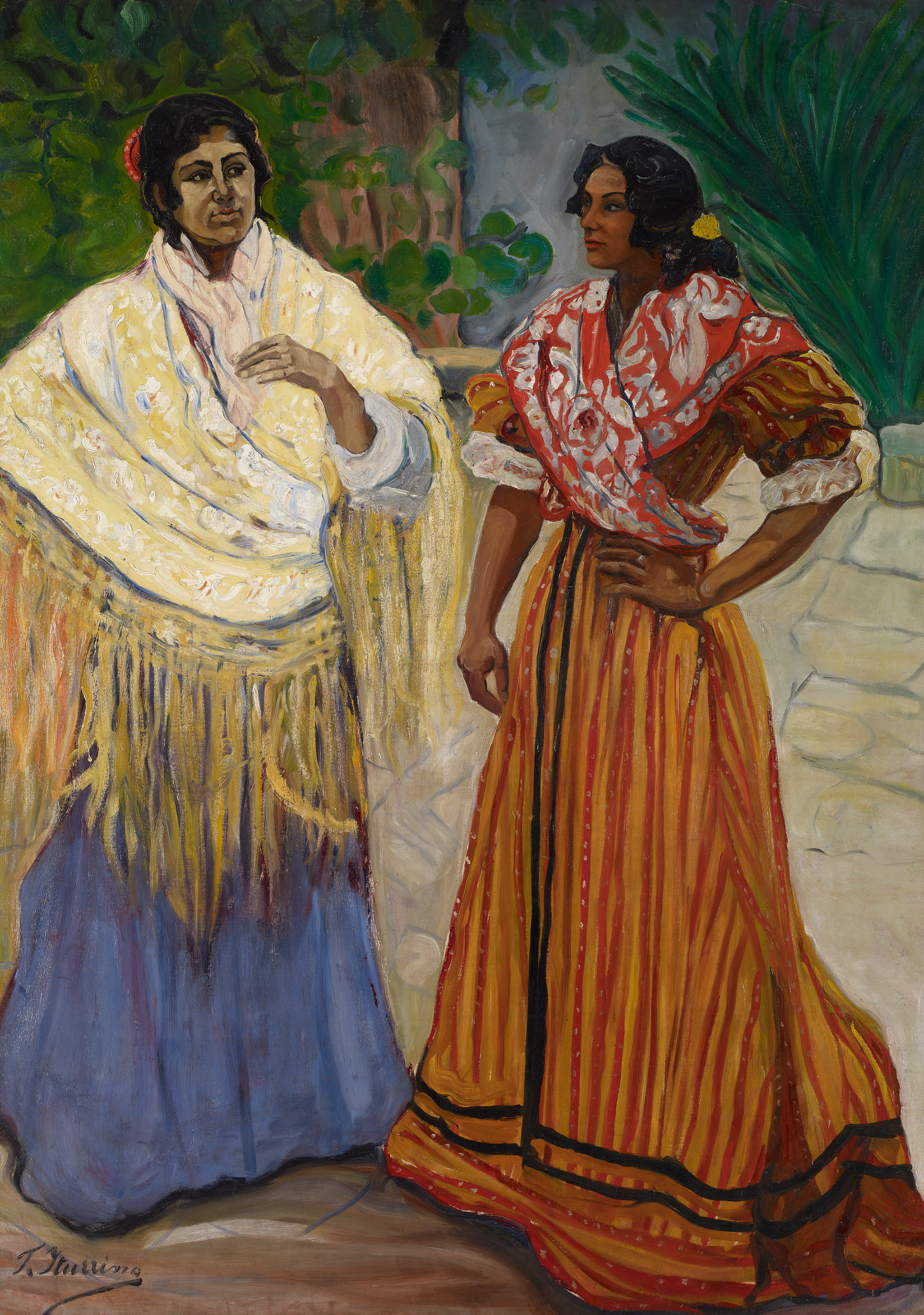
Traditional Romani dress, which was compared to Mississippian clothing by Spanish explorers

Because biological material doesn't survive well in archaeology, and because iconography is fairly limited to ritual paraphernalia, the descriptions of Mississippian clothing come mainly from the earliest European expeditions, notably the Spanish expeditions of De Soto and Juan Pardo. The Gentleman of Elvas and Rodrigo Rangel, two chroniclers of the De Soto expedition, claim that women in the South Appalachian region covered themselves with shawl-like blankets. Some were made from inner Mulberry bark and others were made from Caesarweed or false sisal. One was draped from the waste down, and another on the left shoulder, leaving the right arm exposed. Elvas compared their clothing to the Romani, while Rangel compared it to wandering Egyptians or Bohemians. Mississippian shawls are supported in effigy bottles found in the Nashville area, which depict women in patterned shawls.

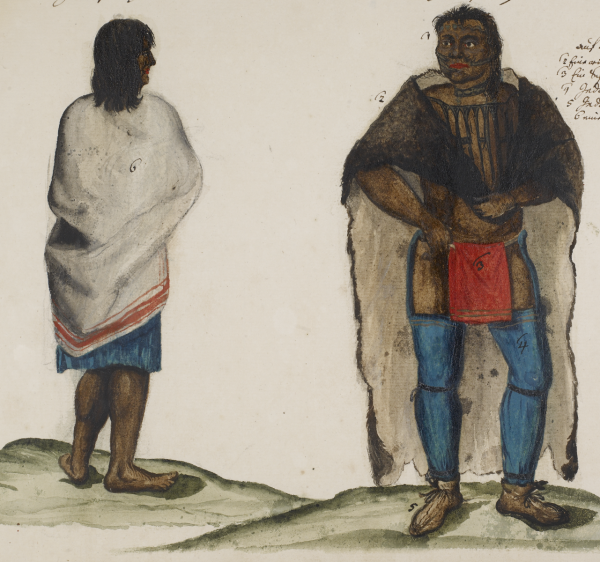
Depiction of the Yuchi king, in line with Spanish descriptions of male attire

The men on the other hand use red-dyed buckskin, one as a loincloth and another placed on the shoulders like a shawl. Buckskin was also used to make shoes. These descriptions of male clothing are startlingly similar to those of Aztec men. The Mississippian rulers, called cacique, holata, or mico by the Spanish, had a different regalia. The ruler of Coosa for example, wore a robe of marten hides and a crown of feathers. Tuskaloosa, ruler of Atahachi, wore a type of turban as well as a blanket of feathers which stretched down to his feet.

=== Music ===
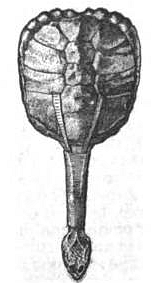
An Eastern Woodlands turtle shell rattle.

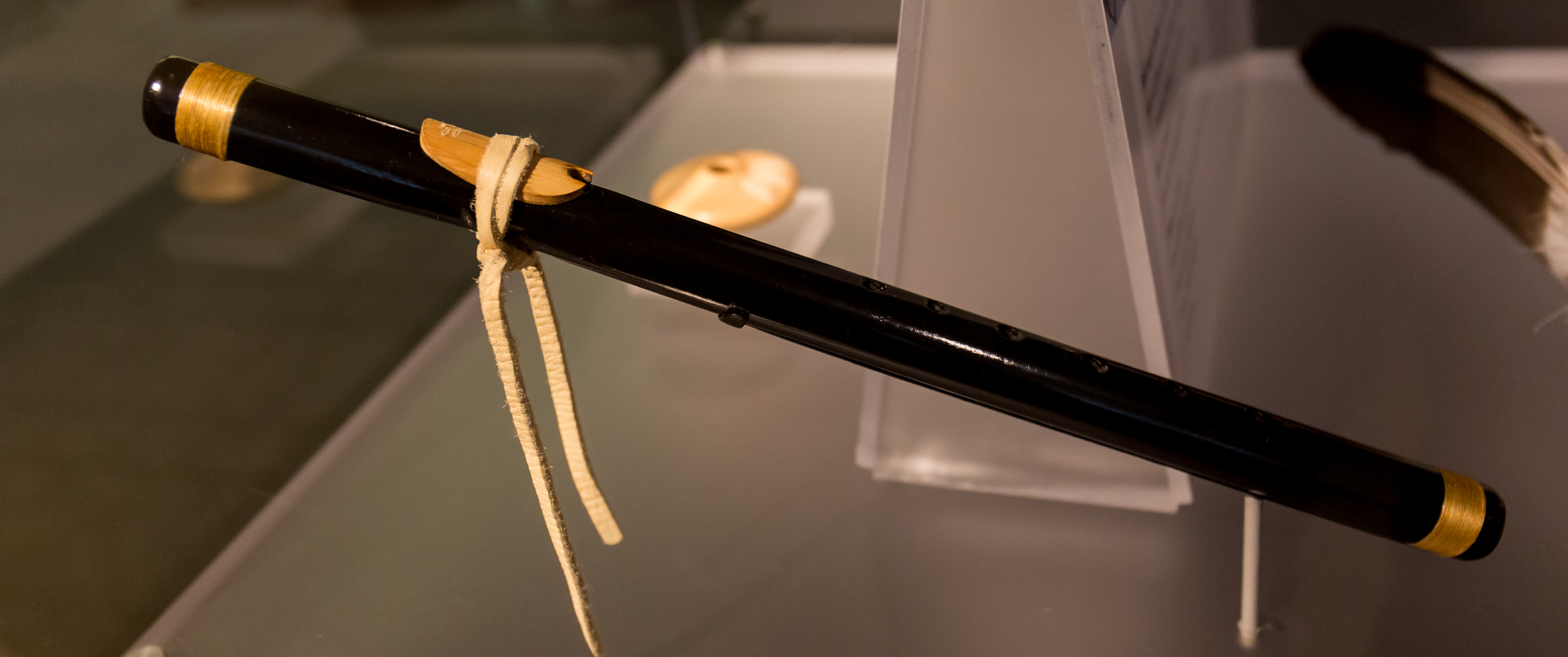
A Chickasaw flute that flew on STS-133 on display at the National Museum of the American Indian.

Several musical instruments, such as rattles, drums, flutes, and bone rasps have been recorded in early expeditions as well as in archaeological investigations. Two flutes have been found archaeologically, both made from river cane. The more intact flute has been dubbed the Breckenridge flute. It is significant for its two chambers, signaling continuity with modern Native American flutes. The exterior bore zigzag lines which may've represented scales and vibrato, and/or represented the energy of lightning. Flutes were recorded in the De Soto expeditions as a sign of peace, and were often played when important rulers were presented to De Soto or when they were entering a substantial town, and remain an important instrument for Native Americans today.

There were several types of rattles. Adorno rattles have been discovered at the Holy Bluff site in the Yazoo Valley, made in the shape of animal and human heads. Muscogee and Cherokee consultants have suggested these rattles were used mimic human heartbeats and used in community-wide festivities. Although only one gourd rattle has been recovered, from Northwest Arkansas, there have been several rock paintings and carved effigies from the period with depictions of gourd rattles. One notable effigy/statuette is the "rattler frog". The rattle held by the frog effigy likely replicating a real rattle that mimicked frog sounds. Other types of rattles recovered from Mississippian sites include turtle shell rattles and wooden face rattles, as well as bison bone and cane rasps. Drums have not been recovered archaeologically, though there are circle-and-dot petroglyphs that may represent drums.

== Science and technology ==
=== Agriculture ===
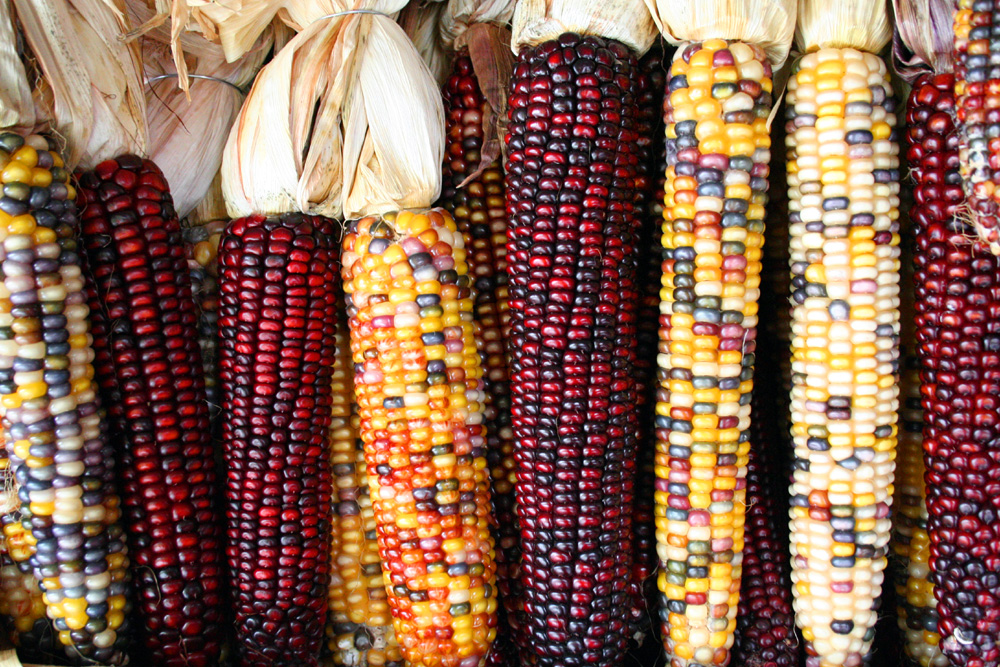
Flint corn cobs

In most places, the Mississippian period coincided with the adoption of comparatively large-scale, intensive maize agriculture, which supported larger populations and craft specialization. They expanded by sectioning off land and working one plot at a time. Tropical flint corn (also known as little corn) arrived during the Hopewell era, c. 200 BC, while Maize de Ocho, the primary strand of flint corn, arrived c. 800 – c. 1000 during the Late Woodland and Emergent Mississippian periods.

=== Architecture ===
==== Wattle and daub ====
In the construction of houses, Mississippians primarily used wattle and daub architecture, a practice inherited by predecessors as far back as the Paleoindian period. In the Lower Mississippi region, the amount of wattle-and-daub construction exploded to a level not seen since the Late Archaic Poverty Point period. In other parts of the Mississippian world however, like in the Midwest, there was more direct continuity with the preceding Woodland period.

Wattle and daub house at Etowah Indian Mounds, reconstructed in the first type.

Wattle and daub involved a woven lattice of wooden strips (the wattle) packed with a sticky matrix of mud, clay, and animal materials (the daub). These houses usually lasted around a decade before being replaced again. Construction of these houses occurred year round. There were likely two types of Mississippian houses. The first is a rigid construction with a framed plate, rafters, and a hipped roof, resembling a European-style or Mesoamerican-style house. This model is how Mississippian period houses in the Southeast have been traditionally interpreted to the public. It has been described for Chickasaw houses in the 1700s by James Adair. The second model is akin to a wigwam, that of a flexed pole or flexed roof, involving bent poles meeting at the top to form a dome structure. This model has been described by several French authors in the 1700s for the Natchez, Choctaw, and several other groups. The size of the house posts, which would've determined flexibility, are used to determine the type.

Wigwam, likely similar to the second type of wattle and daub houses.

For the texturing and covering of the exterior wall, there were several variations. Cypress or pine bark, grass, moss, and maize leaves were all used. As for the roof covering, grass and cane thatch was the norm, at least for the everyman. According to chronicles of the De Soto Expedition, temples and important buildings were covered in more intricate and ornately decorated cane mats, as well as being of a larger size.

The placement of houses was used as a tool of those in power. A quarter of Angel phase households between 1300 and 1450 aligned with the Angel Axis (though Angel site itself only had 5% of their households in this position). This alignment likely enforced the divine 'power' or blessings of the elite of the Angel site. Such celestial alignments existed in other parts of the Mississippian world, likely corresponding to mythological concepts like the Path of Souls and constellations associated with deities, though investigations into their housing patterns have not been conducted.

==== Stone architecture ====
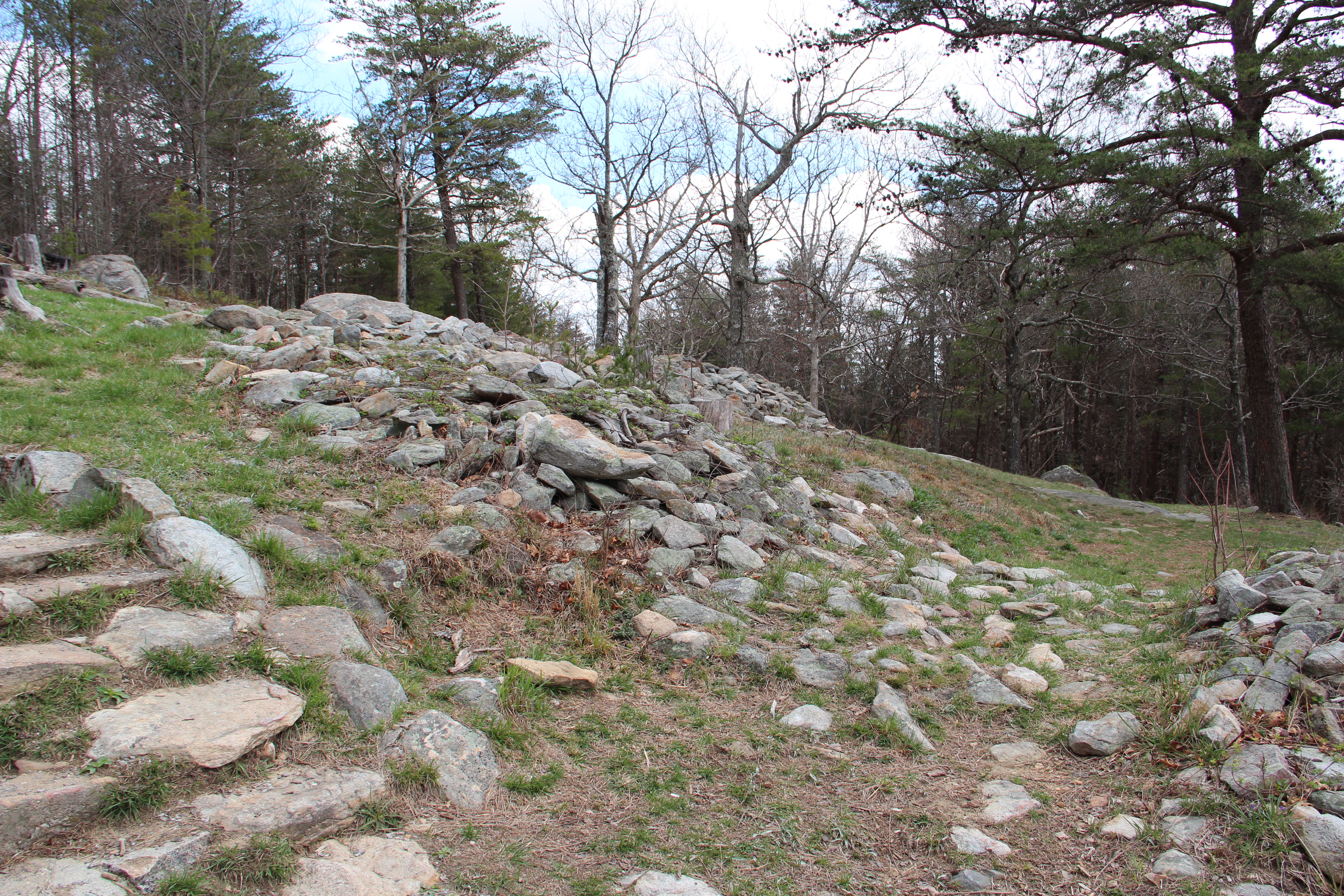
Ruins of the Fort Mountain wall.

Although the use of stone as a building material among Mississippians might not have been as prolific as the neighboring Oneota, Aridoamerican cultures and the Northeastern Woodlands, they still created and maintained limited stone architecture, particularly rock walls or sections of earthern mounds. The boundary marker between the Ocute on the Oconee River and the "short haired people" in the Atlanta region was reported by Spanish expeditions to be Stone Mountain, on which sits a rock wall dating to the Middle Woodland period. This rock wall may've still been used between the Ocute and Short-Haired people, or else may've been the reason for the choice of Stone Mountain as the boundary between them. For most of the Mississippian period stone monuments were limited to polygonal rock piles, rock mantles (layer of rock over an earthen mound), and possibly stone mounds; in some periods and areas the dead were also buried in stone box graves. These monuments were used for religious ceremonies, used as a form of art, as well as a way to honor the dead. Many of these monuments are gone today however, such as Stone Mountain's rock wall, as tourists kept taking rocks from the mountain as a souvenir.

==== Platform mounds ====
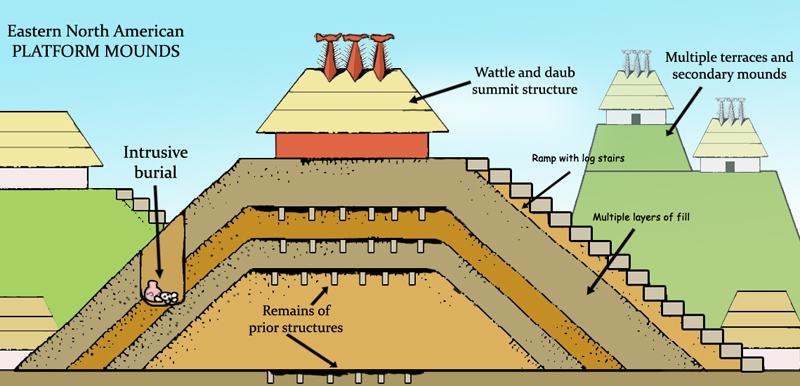
A mound diagram of the platform mound

Although circular forms exist, platform mounds are usually four-sided truncated pyramids built from soil and clay, with ramps, stairs, and ladders made of wooden logs ascending one side of the earthworks. Unlike platform mounds of the preceding Woodland and Archaic periods, Mississippian mounds usually held summit structures that were inhabited year-round. These mounds were built through the offloading of baskets of dirts. The size of the mounds likely reflected how long it was used for, and how powerful its political leaders were.

They were almost always grounded in the cosmos, tied with ideas of the Above World, Beneath World, and death, related to its use for mortuary purposes. For example, the mound axes of Moundville, Angel, and Cahokia are oriented to the Milky Way (Path of Souls) on the night of the summer solstice. An example from the early contact period is the Temple of Cofitachequi, which supported a temple that held an armory, statues, and royal treasures (like pearl and copper). Statues were fashioned with pearls along with other precious materials.

Conical burial mounds were also used to a lesser extent.

=== Metallurgy ===
Mississippian elites at major political and religious centers throughout the midwestern and southeastern United States used ritual copper artifacts as a sign of their status, rather than as tools like the Old Copper complex. Ritual copper in the Southeast had two main sources for their copper: Ducktown Basin in Tennessee and Georgia, and Lake Superior. By 1250, Cahokia's ritual coppers, apparently made at Mound 34, had spread or been gifted or traded to several other sites like Moundville, Etowah, Ocmulgee, and Lake Jackson.

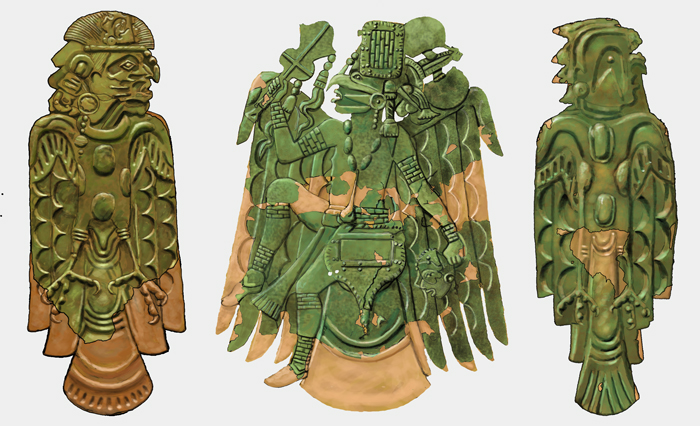
Mississippian copper plates

Metal casting was extremely rare or non-existent or the region. However, likely because of the extremely high amount of native copper deposits in Lake Superior, there have been several artifacts from the Old Copper complex that may show evidence of casting, which indicates the possibility that metal has been cast a few times, though it's still a couple of dozen cast artifacts compared to thousands of copper artifacts made from native copper. There have also been crucible-like structures found in Cahokian copper workshops, and the temperature necessary to melt copper has been achieved by Hopewell pyro engineering before. The most popular method was hammering and annealing the copper into sheets over a fire.

With the advent of European colonization, copper still retained a place in Native American religious life as a special material. For example, among 19th century Muscogee Creeks, a group of copper plates carried along the Trail of Tears are regarded as some of the tribe's most sacred items.

== Related nations ==
Mississippian peoples were ancestral to the majority of the American Indian nations living in the Midwest, East, and Southeast regions of North America when European trade began. The historic and modern day American Indian nations that were Mississippian, or may have descended from the overarching Mississippian culture, include: the Alabama, Apalachee, Arikara, Caddo, Chickasaw, Catawba, Choctaw, Muscogee Creek, Guale, Hitchiti, Ho-Chunk, Houma, Iowa, Kansa, Koroas, Missouria, Mobilian, Natchez, Omaha, Osage (possibly), Otoe, Pawnee, Ponca, Quapaw (possibly), Seminole (broad origins), Taensas, Tunicas, Yamasee, Yazoos, and Yuchi.

== See also ==
- List of Mississippian sites
- List of burial mounds in the United States
- Ocmulgee Mounds National Historical Park
- Southeastern Ceremonial Complex
