= Pacaha =

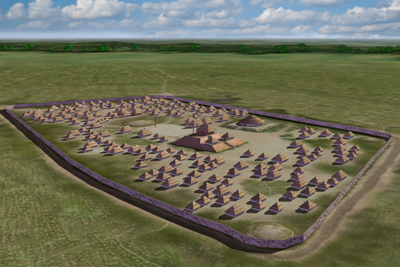
An illustration of the Nodena site in northeastern Arkansas. Artist H. Roe

Pacaha was a Native American polity encountered in 1541 by the Hernando de Soto expedition. This group inhabited fortified villages in what is today the northeastern portion of the U.S. state of Arkansas.

The tribe takes its name from the chieftain Pacaha (born in the early 16th century), who ruled the tribe from its primary village on the Mississippi River, which is thought to be located in present-day Crittenden County, Arkansas near Turrell. The site, part of the Nodena phase, is known to archaeologists as "The Bradley Site". Information about Chief Pacaha and his people comes from journals made during the expedition of Hernando De Soto in 1541. The de Soto expedition stayed at Pacaha's village for approximately 40 days.

== De Soto expedition ==
The initial encounter between the Pacaha and the de Soto expedition was violent. Chief Pacaha's tribe had been at war for some time with a neighboring chieftain named Casqui. The Casqui tribe is thought to have lived at a site near Parkin, Arkansas, which is the location of the present-day Parkin Archeological State Park.

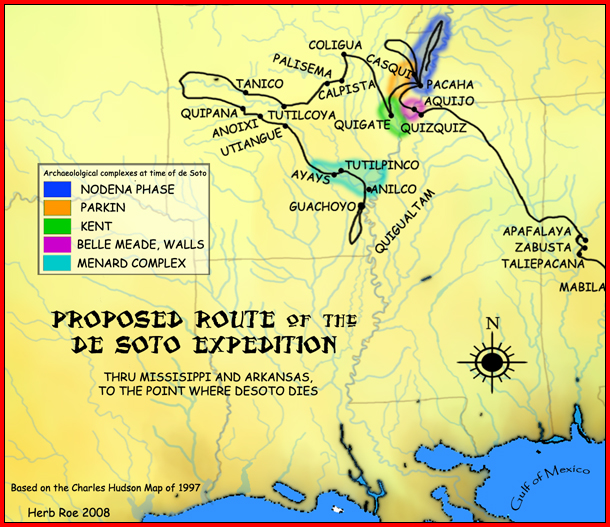
A map showing the de Soto expedition route through Mississippi, and Arkansas, up to the point de Soto dies. Based on the Charles M. Hudson map of 1997.

De Soto had encountered the Casqui tribe first. When he pressed on to visit the Pacaha village, many of the Casqui people followed him. Many of the Pacaha, seeing the approach of their enemy, attempted to flee to an island in the river and drowned. The Casqui who accompanied de Soto sacked the village, desecrated holy sites, and looted valuables.

The Pacaha controlled more territory and had a larger population than the Casqui. Chief Pacaha was younger than the Casqui chief, however, and seemingly had more to lose from the continued aggressive Casqui attacks. De Soto contacted Chief Pacaha and convinced him that he had nothing to do with the attack and that the expedition's intentions were peaceful. De Soto assured the Pacaha that the expedition would help the Pacaha attack the Casqui to punish them for their subterfuge.

The Casqui received advance warning of the planned attack. They returned the looted items and apologized in order to stave off retribution. De Soto arranged a dinner for the two leaders and a peace treaty between the tribes. Chief Pacaha presented de Soto with one of his wives, one of his sisters, and another woman from his tribe. This action was in gratitude for the arrangement of peace and also to outdo his rival, who had only presented a daughter to de Soto.

The Hernando de Soto expedition records are the only historical records of Chief Pacaha and his tribe. Their later history is uncertain.

The name Pacaha was spelled Capaha in one account. Some scholars believe this word is related to the historic Quapaw tribe encountered in Arkansas by European expeditions in the 17th and 18th centuries. The primary village of the eastern Arkansas Quapaw was named Kappa or Kappah. Human and cultural remains found at the suspected Pacaha site are repatriated to the Quapaw and Tunica-Biloxi tribes, which are active.

== See also ==
- Tunica people
- List of sites and peoples visited by the Hernando de Soto Expedition
- Mississippian culture
