= Casqui =

Native American polity

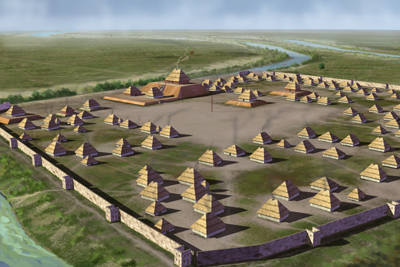
Capital of the Casqui Province. Illustration by H. Roe

Casqui was a Native American polity visited in 1541 by the Hernando de Soto expedition. It was composed of many fortified villages in eastern Arkansas.

== Name ==
Casqui takes its name from its leader at contact named Casqui.

== History ==
Casqui's primary village is thought to be located in present day Cross County, Arkansas near the town of Parkin. The suspected site is the focal point of the Parkin Archeological State Park and it has been determined that the site was continuously occupied for at least 500 years. Information about the polity comes from journals made during the expedition of Hernando de Soto in 1541.

When de Soto's expedition arrived in the area, the Casqui walked over a mile from their village to greet the travelers and invite them to stay in the town. The travelers declined the offer and made camp outside of the village. The journals report that de Soto gave a speech to the Casqui about religion and baptized several of the villagers as Christians. The journals report that the villagers helped them erect a large wooden cross on the central mound.

When de Soto determined to press on and visit the nearby tribe called the Pacaha, many of the Casqui people followed him. The Casqui and the Pacaha had been at war for some time and the Casqui had raided the Pacaha on previous occasions. When de Soto and the Casqui approached, many of the Pacaha became afraid and attempted to flee to an island in the river and drowned. The Casqui who had followed de Soto proceeded to sack the village, desecrate religious sites, and steal everything they could.

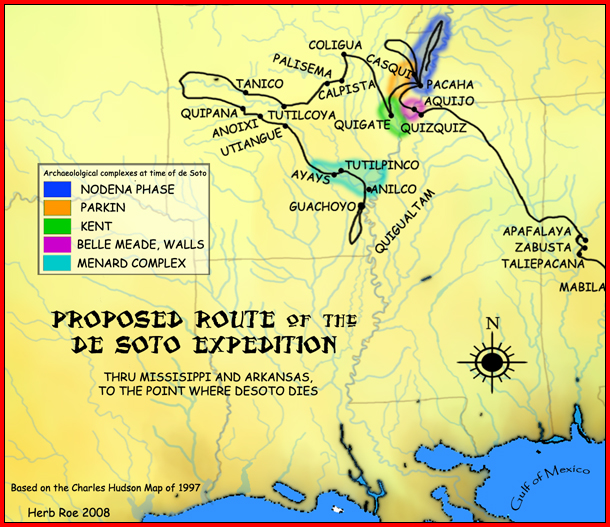
A map showing the de Soto expedition route through Mississippi, and Arkansas, up to the point de Soto dies. Based on the Charles M. Hudson map of 1997.

De Soto contacted the leader of Pacaha and convinced him that he had nothing to do with the attack and that the expedition's intentions were peaceful. De Soto even assured the Pacaha that the expedition would help the Pacaha attack the Casqui to punish them for their subterfuge.

The Casqui received warning of the planned attack and returned the looted items to the Pacaha and issued an apology to stave off retribution. De Soto arranged a dinner for the two leaders and a peace treaty was made between the tribes.

The Hernando de Soto expedition records are the only historical records of Chief Casqui and his tribe. Their later history is known primarily through archaeology.

In recent years, a Spanish trade bead which matches descriptions of the seven-layer glass beads carried by the expedition has been found at the Parkin site, as well as two Spanish falconer's bells, and Spanish musket balls.

== See also ==
- Tunica people
- List of sites and peoples visited by the Hernando de Soto Expedition
- Pacaha
- Mississippian culture
