= George R. Mann =

American architect (1856–1939)

- Born: July 12, 1856; Syracuse, Indiana
- Died: March 20, 1939 (aged 82); Little Rock, Arkansas
- Occupation: Architect

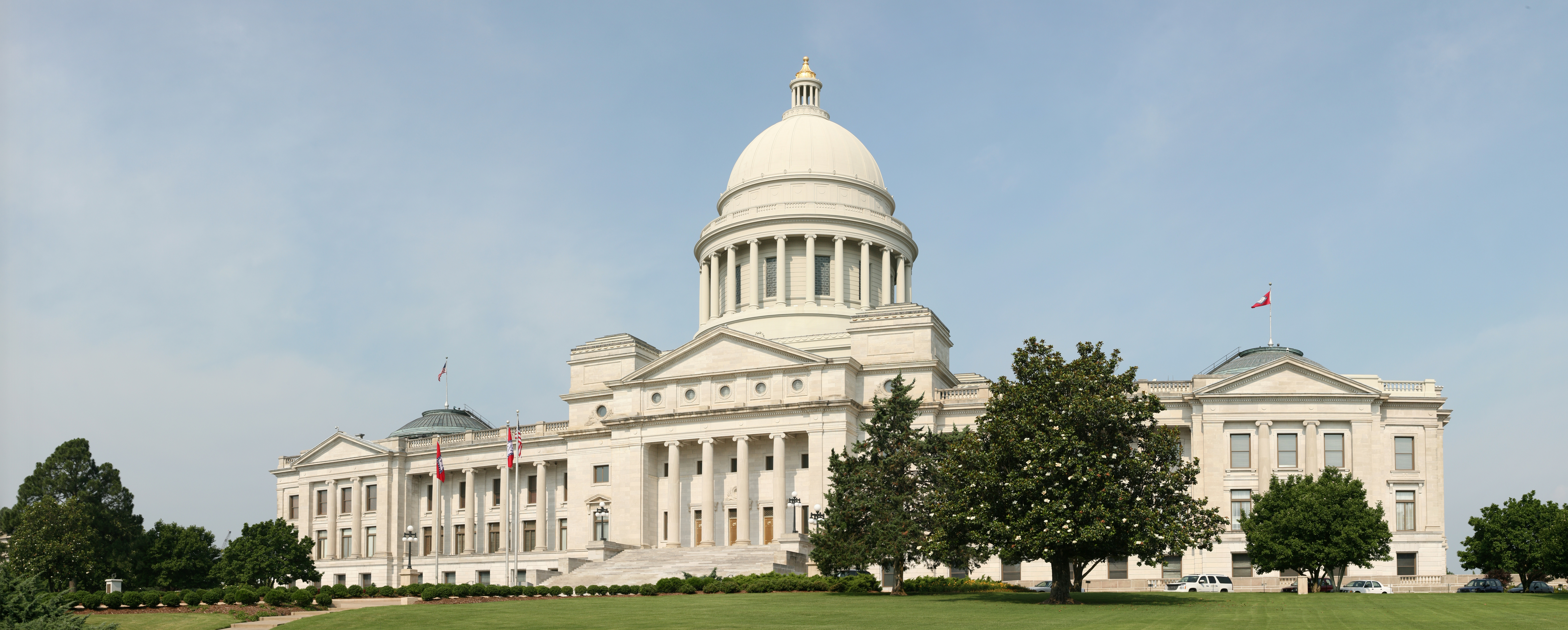
Arkansas State Capitol (1899–1915)

George Richard Mann (July 12, 1856 – March 20, 1939) was an American architect, trained at MIT, whose designs included the Arkansas State Capitol. He was the leading architect in Arkansas from 1900 until 1930, and his designs were among the finalists in competitions for the capitols of several other states.

== Career ==
Mann was born in Syracuse, Indiana, and trained at MIT. From 1906 to 1912, Mann's office was a Beaux-Arts commercial building built to his design. It remains standing, at 115 East 5th Street, Little Rock, Arkansas.

Beginning in 1913, he partnered with Eugene John Stern, as the architectural firm of Mann & Stern. He became dissatisfied working with Stern and the partnership ended by 1928. In 1929, he had partnered in the firm Mann, Wanger & King.

Many of Mann's works are listed on the U.S. National Register of Historic Places.

== Family ==
On June 28, 1910, Mann's daughter Wilhelmina married John N. Heiskell, editor of the Arkansas Gazette. Their children included Elizabeth, Louise, John N. Jr., and Carrick. Mann died in Little Rock, Arkansas, in 1939.

== Works ==
- Albert Pike Hotel, 7th and Scott Sts. Little Rock, AR (Mann, George R.), NRHP-listed
- Arkansas State Capitol, 5th and Woodlane Sts. Little Rock, AR (Mann, George R.), NRHP-listed
- One or more works in Bathhouse Row, Central Ave. between Reserve and Fountain Sts., in Hot Springs National Park Hot Springs, AR (Mann, George), NRHP-listed
- George R. Mann Building, 115 E. 5th St. Little Rock, AR (Mann, George R.), NRHP-listed
- Gus Blass Department Store, 318–324 Main St. Little Rock, AR (Mann, George R.), NRHP-listed
- One or more works in El Dorado Commercial Historic District, Courthouse Square, portions of Main, Jefferson, Washington, Jackson, Cedar and Locust Sts. El Dorado, AR (Mann, George R. & Stern, Eugene J.), NRHP-listed
- Fort Smith Masonic Temple, 200 N. 11th St. Fort Smith, AR (Mann, George R.), NRHP-listed
- Gazette Building, 112 W. 3rd St. Little Rock, AR (Mann, George R.), NRHP-listed
- Hotel Bentley, 801 3rd St. Alexandria, LA (Mann, George R.), NRHP-listed
- Hotel Pines, Main St. and W. 5th Ave. Pine Bluff, AR (Mann, George R.), NRHP-listed
- Marion Hotel
- Little Rock Central High School, 1500 Park Street, Little Rock, AR (Almand, Delony, Mann, Stern, Wittenburg), NRHP-listed
- Pulaski County Courthouse, 405 W. Markham St. Little Rock, AR (Mann, George), NRHP-listed
- Hotel Riceland, 3rd Street and South Main Street, Stuttgart, Arkansas, NRHP-listed
- Rose Building, 307 Main St. Little Rock, AR (Mann, George R.), NRHP-listed
- St. Vincent's Hospital, 7301 St. Charles Rock Rd. Normandy, MO (Mann, George R.), NRHP-listed
- Union Life Building, 212 Center St. Little Rock, AR (Mann, George R.), NRHP-listed
- Worthen Bank Building, 401 Main St. Little Rock, AR (Mann, George R.), NRHP-listed

== Gallery ==
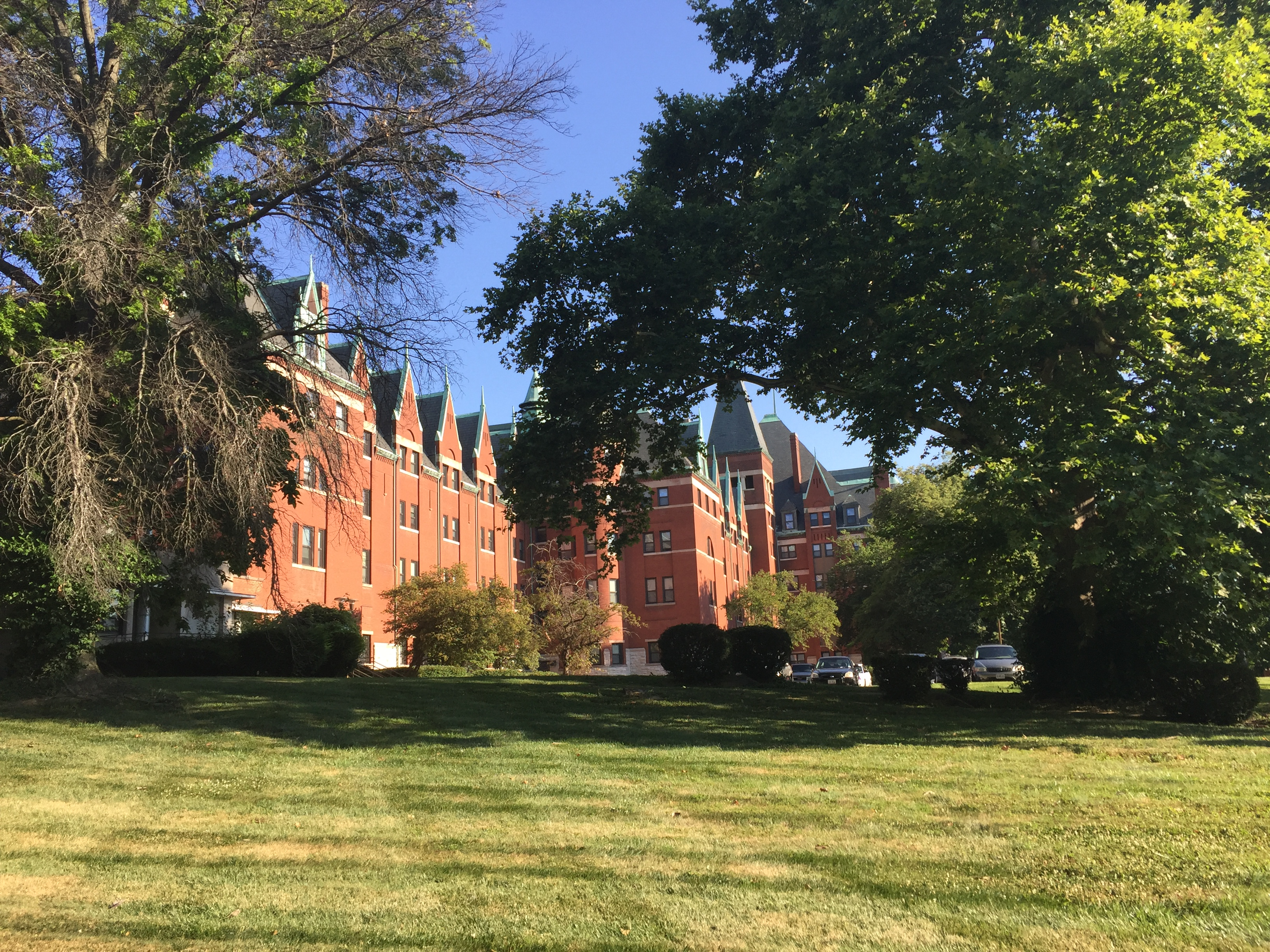
St. Vincent's Hospital, built 1894 in Normandy, Missouri

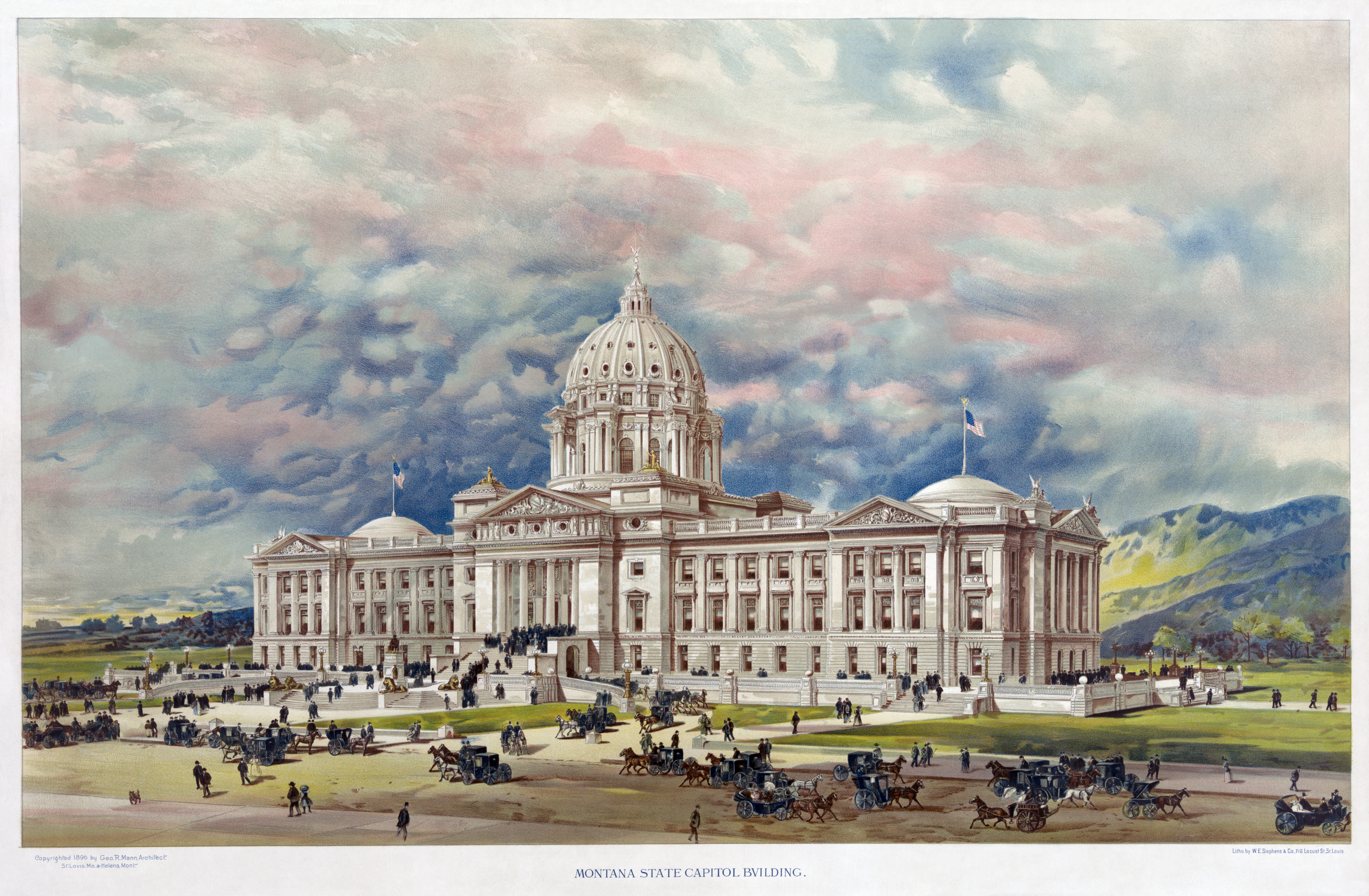
Winning competition design for the Montana State Capitol, 1896 (unbuilt but later used for the Arkansas State Capitol)

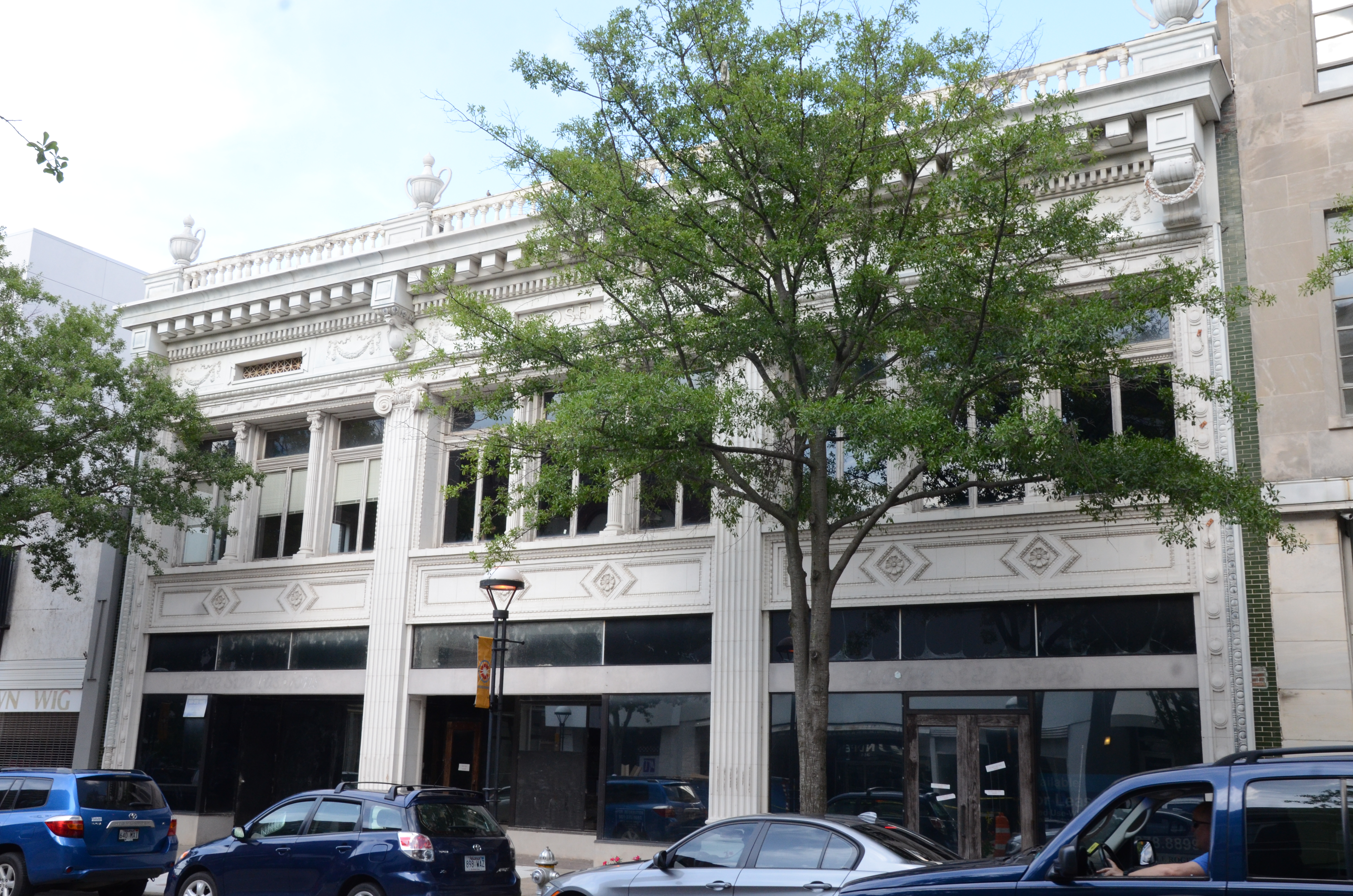
Rose Building, built 1900 in Little Rock, Arkansas

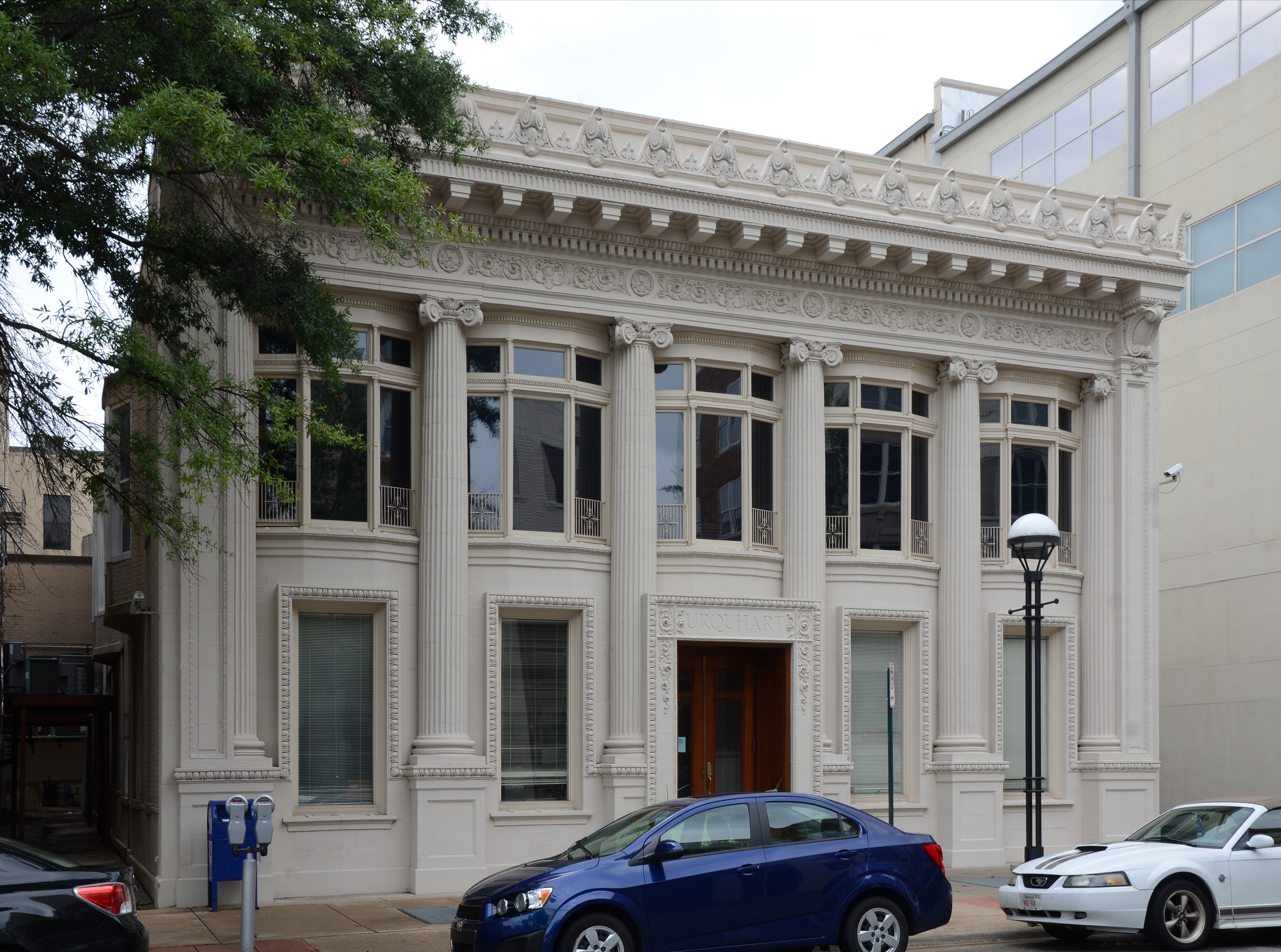
George R. Mann Building, built 1906 to house Mann's office in Little Rock, Arkansas

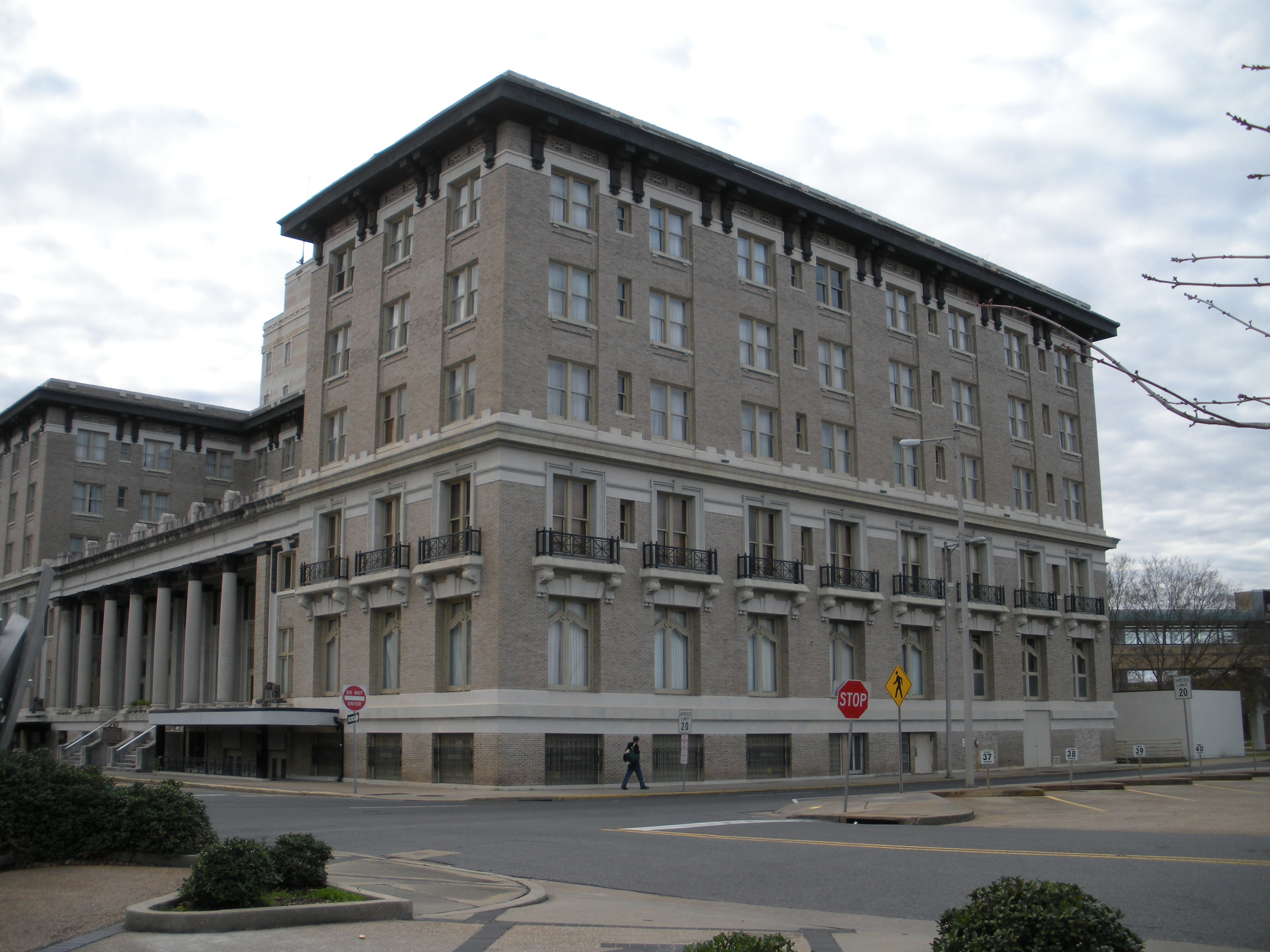
Hotel Bentley, opened 1908 in Alexandria, Louisiana

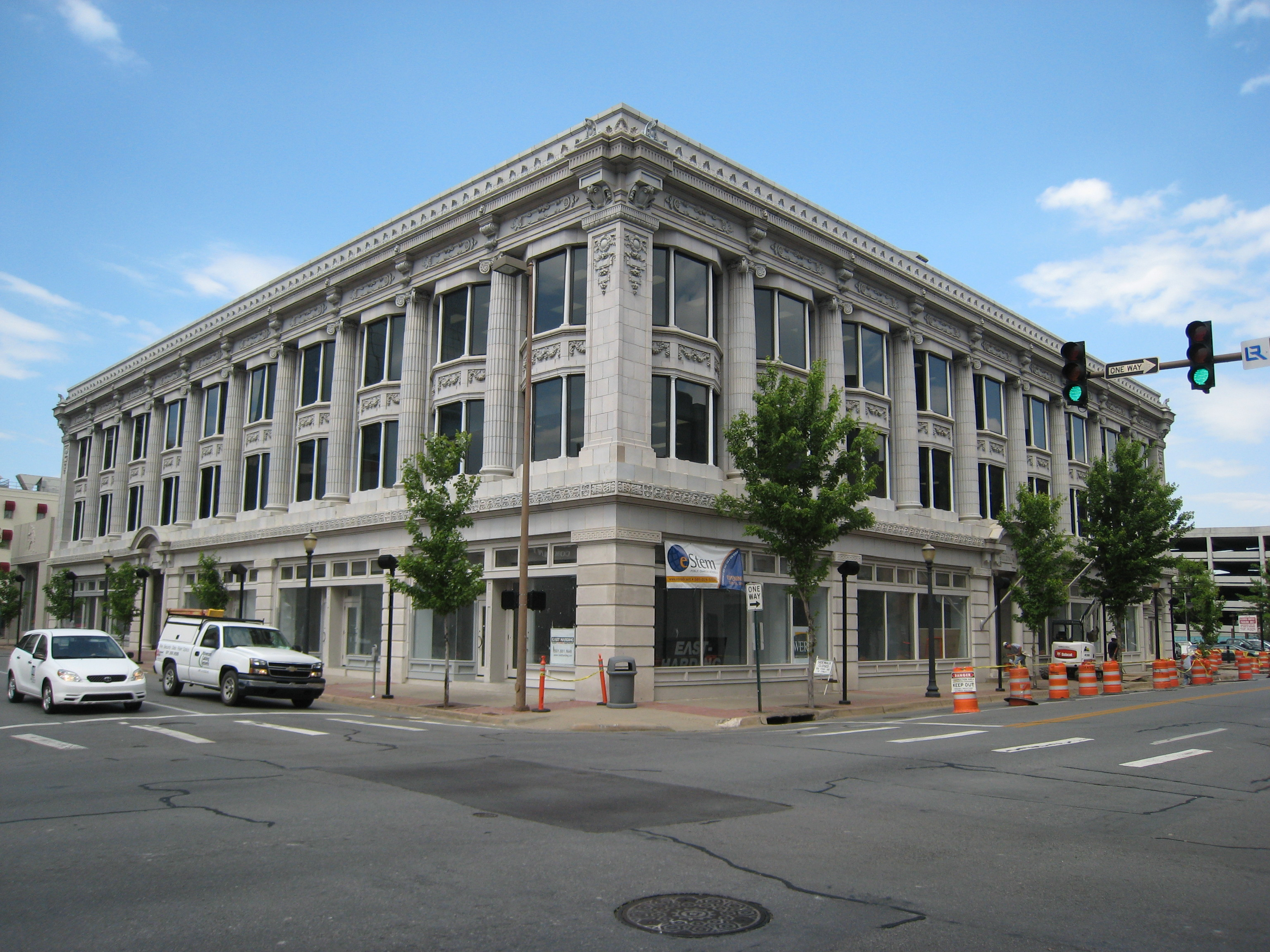
The Gazette Building, built 1908 in Little Rock, Arkansas

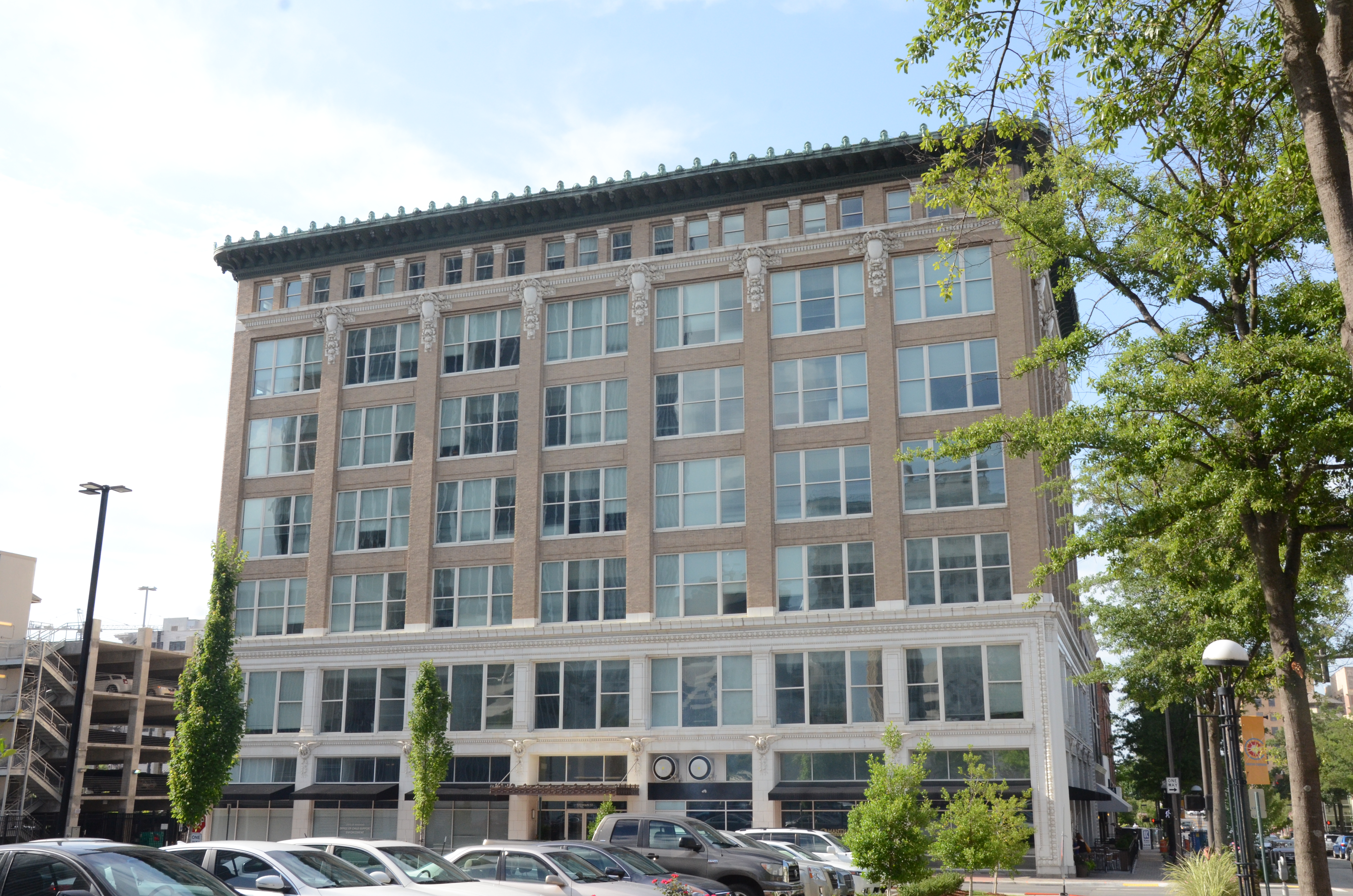
Gus Blass Department Store, built 1912 in Little Rock, Arkansas; an early example of two-way concrete slab construction

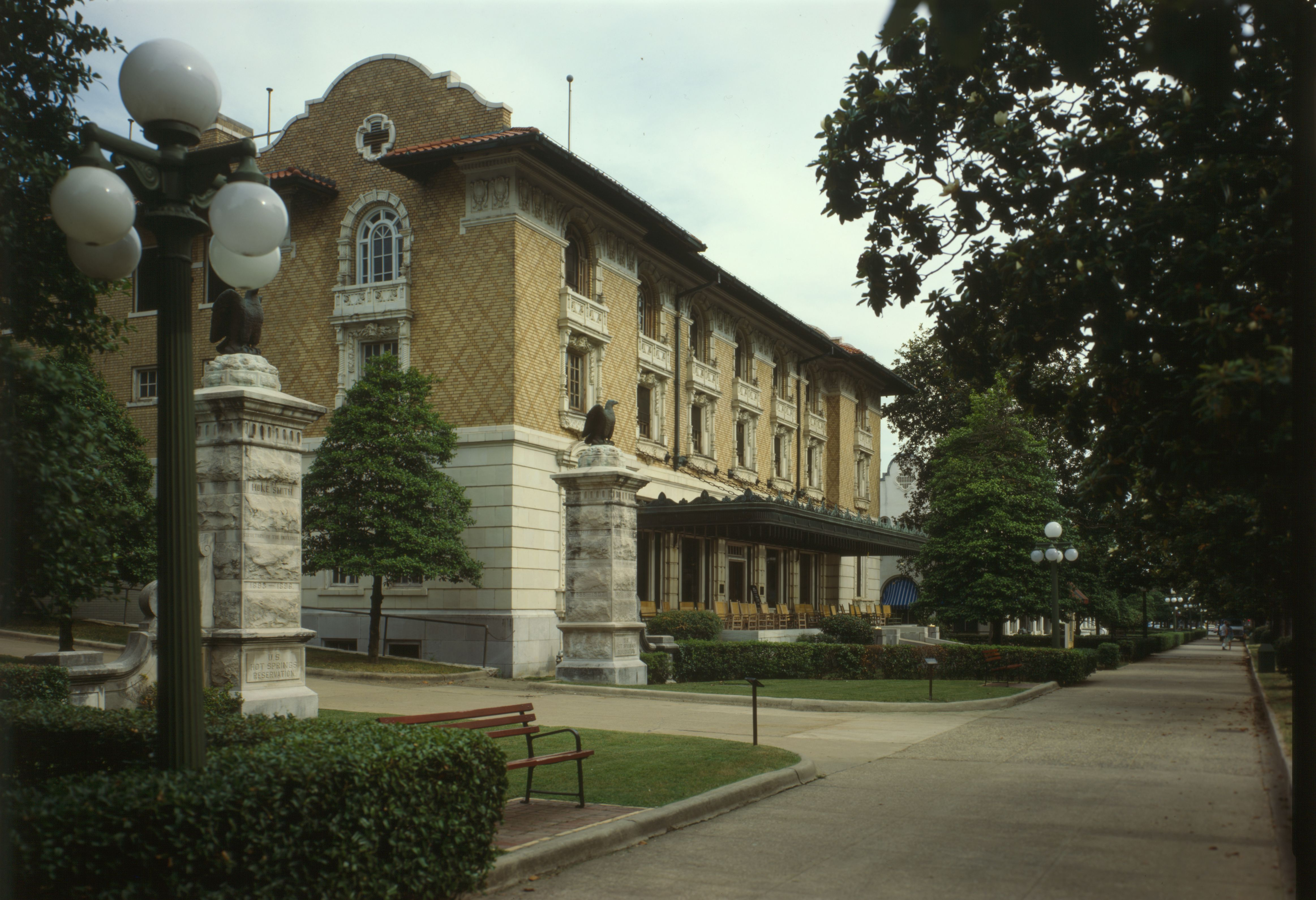
Fordyce Bathhouse, built 1914–15 in Hot Springs, Arkansas

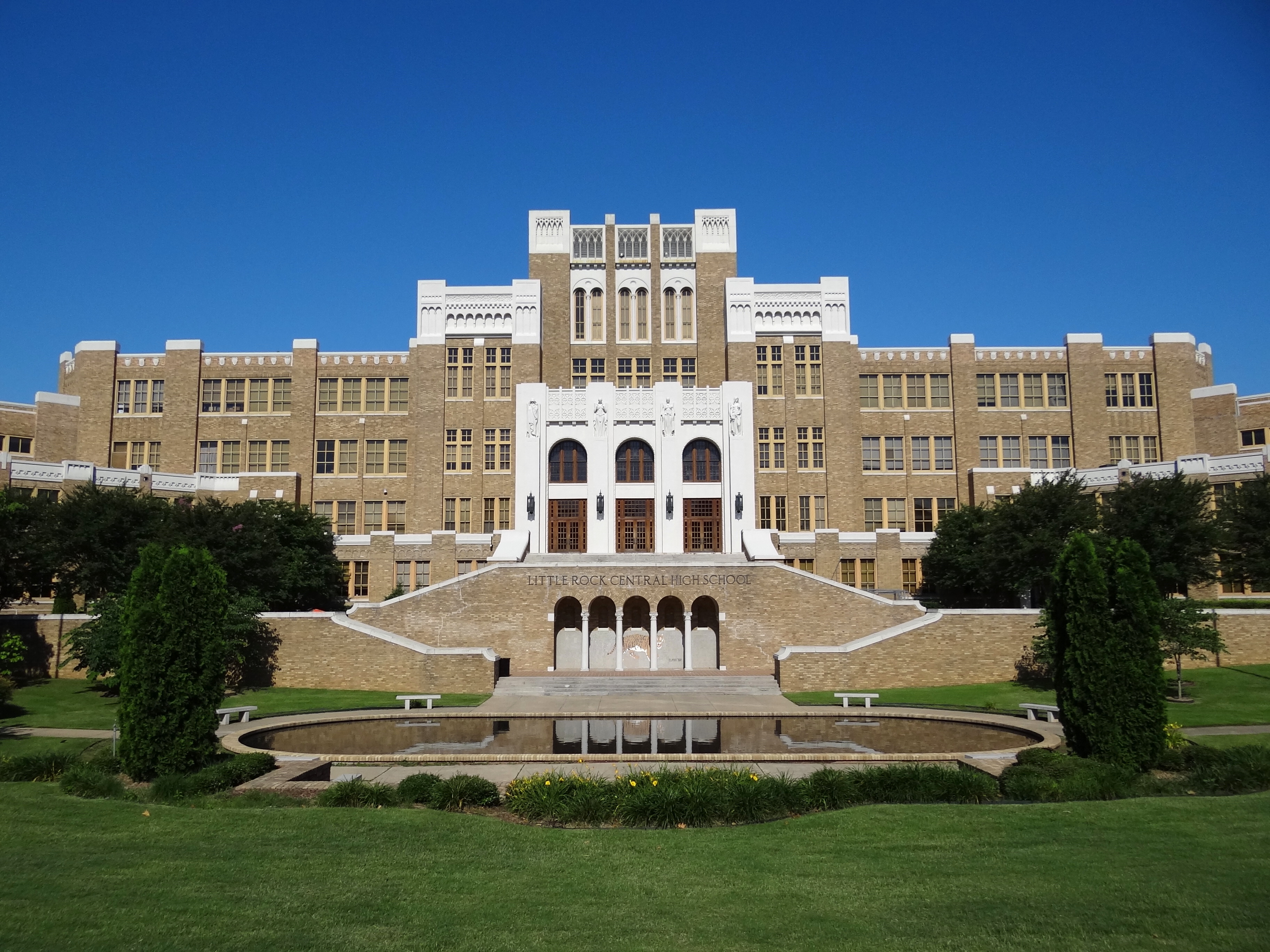
Little Rock Central High School, completed in 1927; costing $1.5 million, at the time it was dubbed the most expensive school ever built in the United States

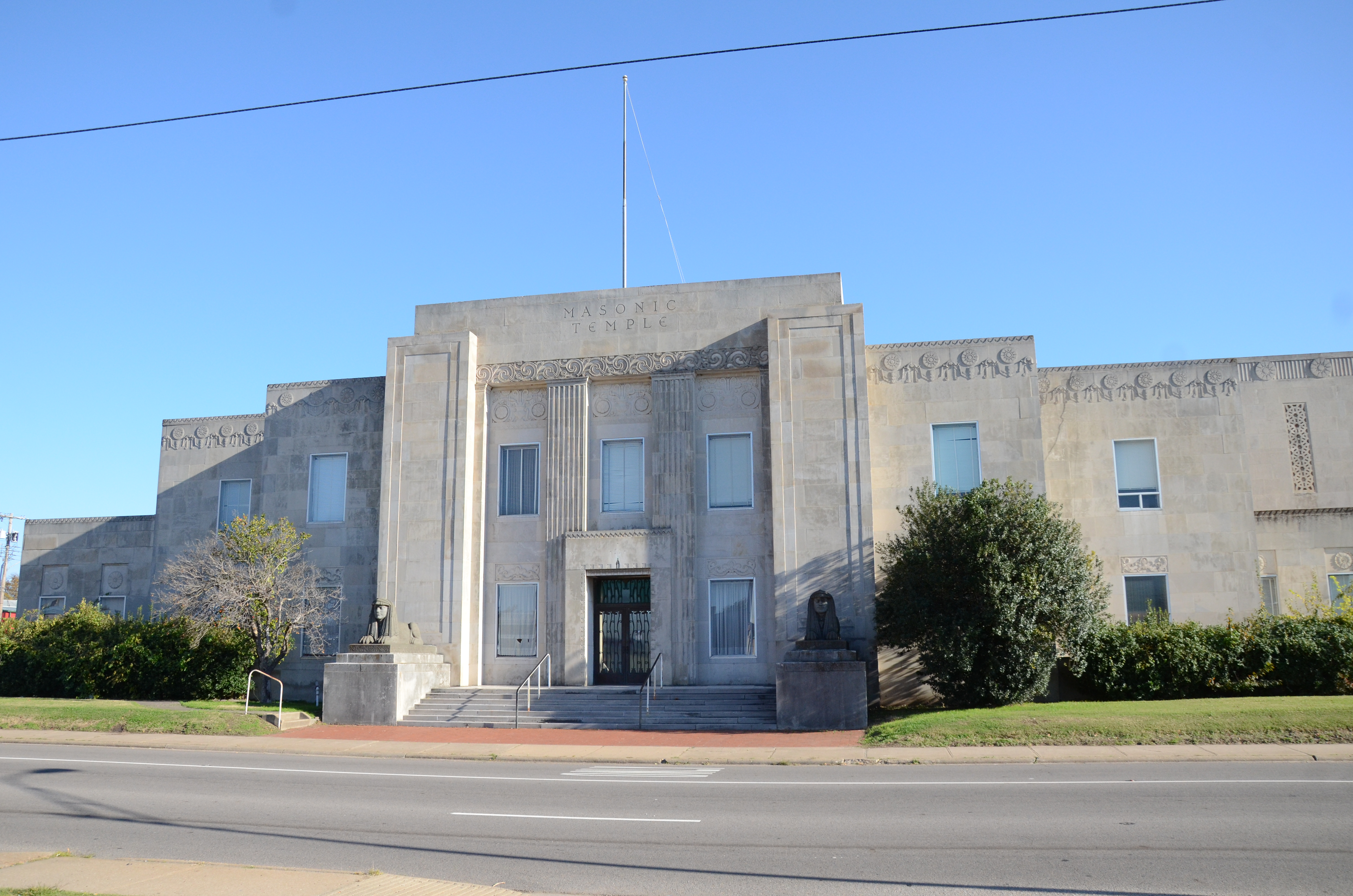
Fort Smith Masonic Temple, completed 1929 in Fort Smith, Arkansas; a rare example of Egyptian Revival architecture in the state
