= Arkansas Constitutional Amendment 75 =

Amendment 75
- November 5, 1996
- Arkansas Constitutional Amendment 75

Results
Choice	Votes	%
Yes	405,216	50.52%
No	396,932	49.48%
Yes
60–70%
50–60%
No
70–80%
60–70%
50–60%

Arkansas Constitutional Amendment 75 (sometimes called Conservation Tax Amendment, known as Referred Amendment 2 prior to passage) amended the Constitution of Arkansas to create a stable funding source to preserve the natural beauty and history of the state. The amendment created a permanent excise tax of one-eighth of one percent upon all taxable sales of property and services. The amendment was referred by the Arkansas General Assembly (legislative referral) to voters, and was approved during the November 5, 1996 election.

== History ==
Proposed Revenue Split by Agency
1. Game and Fish Commission (45.0%)
2. State Parks (45.0%)
3. Department of Arkansas Heritage (9.00%)
4. Keep Arkansas Beautiful (1.00%)

The proposed amendment addressed two longstanding concerns in the state, establish permanent funding for state parks and the Arkansas Game and Fish Commission. The dedicated tax would not be subject to the Arkansas General Assembly budgeting process, which had produced a funding shortfall for state parks which had grown from $45 million in 1985 to $170 million by 1994. Budgeting cycles had largely produced funding for establishing new parks, but inadequate funding for ongoing maintenance or operations. State parks had been unable to develop a state park on Beaver Lake (now known as Hobbs State Park – Conservation Area), which had been authorized but not funded by the General Assembly since 1979. Beginning in 1994, state parks had instituted entrance fees at some parks in an attempt to raise funds to pay for maintenance. The Game and Fish Commission, which maintains the state's system of wildlife management areas, did not receive funding from the General Assembly and was funded entirely by hunting and fishing licenses.

Prior attempts to establish such funding sources had failed, including a similar tax referendum in 1984 with all revenue going to Game and Fish. An initiative in 1986 was withdrawn before the election, and a court struck a similar measure from the ballot in 1994 six days before the election.

The tax was anticipated to generate $37 million per year at a cost of 90 cents per Arkansan per month. State parks produced a ten-year plan with $12.2 million for capital improvements, $2.2 million for operation and maintenance, and $1.1 million for equipment. Game and Fish anticipated spending $5 million on community fishing programs, building a network of nature centers, and protecting endangered species, $5 million hiring law enforcement officers, $2.3 million for conservation education, and $3.4 million for conservation and habitat development programs on private lands. The remaining funds were anticipated to renovate historic buildings and historical sites.

Governor of Arkansas Mike Huckabee and First Lady Janet Huckabee took a boat trip down the length of the Arkansas River in the state to generate support for the measure. The trip was viewed as a publicity stunt by opponents and generated questions about using state employees and resources on the trip to promote a political campaign.

=== Support ===
- Governor of Arkansas Mike Huckabee
- First Lady of Arkansas Janet Huckabee
- Rex Nelson
- Natural State Committee
- Conservation Committee for Amendment 2
- Northeast Arkansas Natural State Committee
- Arkansas Game and Fish Foundation
- Arkansas Tourism Development Foundation
- The Nature Conservancy
- Speaker of the Arkansas House of Representatives Bobby Hogue
- Kaneaster Hodges Jr.
- Robert S. Moore Jr.

=== Opposition ===
- Arkansas Democrat Gazette
- Arkansas Farm Bureau, initially neutral, later sought repeal after passage
- Arkansas Municipal League
- Citizens to Save Our Constitution

=== Polling ===
Poll source	Date(s) administered	Sample size	Margin of error	For	Against	Undecided
The Kitchens Group	April 29-30, 1996	500	4.3	61%	31%	7%

== Results ==
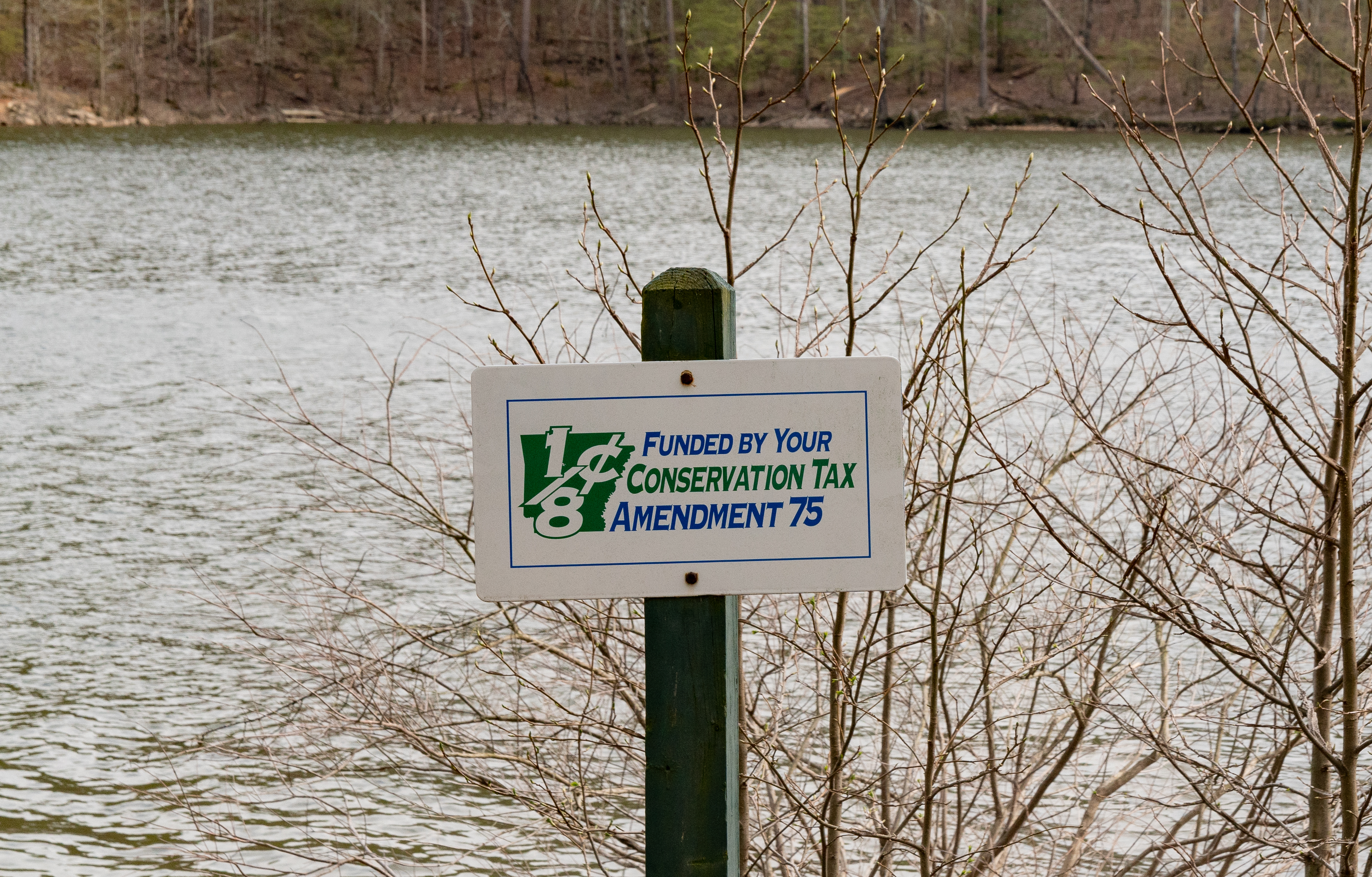
Amendment 75 sign near boat ramp in Daisy State Park

Arkansas Referred Amendment 2 (1996)
Choice	Votes	%
For	405,216	50.52
Against	396,932	49.48
Total	802,148	100.00

Following passage, Arkansas became only the second state to have a dedicated funding source for conservation, with the Missouri Department of Conservation funded in a similar manner since 1977. In a 1999 survey, 46% strongly supported the conservation tax, with 29% supporting it, and 10% strongly opposed.
