= George Fisher (cartoonist) =

American cartoonist

George Fisher (8 April 1923 – 15 December 2003) was an American political cartoonist.

== Early life ==
George Fisher was born just outside of Searcy, Arkansas, on 8 April 1923, the son of Charles W. and Gladys Fisher. George's father was born in Tennessee and was a home builder and business owner. Fisher's mother died when he was 5 years old and his father never remarried. Fisher's father encouraged George's artistic ability and suggested political subjects for him to draw. Fisher had his first cartoon published in 1944 lampooning Arkansas governor Homer Martin Adkins for claiming credit for wartime factory construction in Arkansas.

== Education and Participation in War ==
Fisher attended Beebe College for one year, after which he withdrew to join the United States Army. Fisher entered the service on June 6, 1943, under the branch of Cannon Co. 417th Infantry, 76th Division. He trained at Camp Roberts (California) and Camp McCoy (Wisconsin) and was engaged in the Argonne Forest, Rhineland and Central Europe. Fisher reached the rank of Staff Sergeant before his discharge on April 8, 1946, as well as a Bronze Star. Fisher served in Europe as an infantryman and participated in the Battle of the Bulge. While in service, Fisher kept a daily cartoon diary of his experiences and drew cartoons for his regimental newspaper.

While stationed in Bournemouth, England Fisher met a female artist named Rosemary Snook. After the war, Fisher married Snook and began hiding her nickname, "Snooky", into most of his cartoons. Finding the hidden nickname became a favorite game for those who read his cartoons regularly.

== Career ==
At the conclusion of the war, Fisher returned to West Memphis, Arkansas, and began drawing cartoons for the West Memphis News. The newspaper was run by former soldiers who had returned from the war and determined to stand up to the political machine that controlled local and statewide politics at the time. Fisher worked for the newspaper until it was forced to close.

Fisher moved to Little Rock, Arkansas, and started doing commercial art work for the Southwestern Bell Telephone Company. With the advent of television, Fisher and his wife sought out a job at the local ABC affiliate KATV and established a syndicated puppet show called Phydeaux and His Friends which specialized in political satire. Local political figures, including Governor Orval Faubus, made guest appearances on the show.

Fisher convinced the weekly North Little Rock Times to start carrying his political cartoons and, before long, other newspapers began reprinting them in their Sunday editions.

In 1972, Fisher began drawing cartoons twice per week for the statewide Arkansas Gazette and became the newspaper's official cartoonist in 1976. Fisher gained a very active following in the state of Arkansas and became an Arkansas institution. Fisher's work was never syndicated, because he preferred to focus mostly on affairs in his home state, but many of his cartoons were reprinted nationally.

== Death ==
Fisher died of a heart Attack on 15 December 2003 at his home after completing a Christmas cartoon for the Arkansas Times.

His wife died in 1983, but Fisher continued to hide her nickname in his cartoons as a tribute.

Fisher's most famous statewide cartoon was a drawing of Governor Orval Faubus addressing a session of the Arkansas legislature where everyone present, even the mice and statues, had the face of Orval Faubus.

His most famous nationally reprinted cartoon was on the occasion of the Space Shuttle Challenger disaster.

His work has been published in several anthologies and he has been acclaimed as one of the great cartoonists of the 20th century.

Fisher was buried at Beebe Cemetery in Beebe, Arkansas.

This article is originated from Internet-Encyclopedia, December 22, 2003.
