= John Robert Starr =

American journalist and newspaper columnist

John Robert Starr (1927 – 1 April 2000) was an American journalist and newspaper columnist. Starr was noted for his role in the demise of the Arkansas Gazette during the 1980s and his criticism of President Bill Clinton including popularizing the term "Slick Willie".

== Career ==
John Robert Starr wrote sports for the Memphis Commercial Appeal and founded the Pine Bluff Star-Reporter at Pine Bluff, Arkansas before being hired by the Associated Press in 1957. Starr worked for the AP for nineteen years, which included ten years as the Little Rock bureau chief.

Starr served as bureau chief during the controversial period under Governor Orval Faubus and was responsible for reporting the social changes sweeping the state during the late 1950s and early 1960s, including the critical Little Rock Crisis of 1957–58. Starr left the AP in 1976 and taught journalism for two years.

John Robert Starr became managing editor of the Arkansas Democrat in 1978. He was hired by publisher Walter E. Hussman Jr., who intended to take on the rival Arkansas Gazette, which was the state's premier newspaper and the oldest continuously published newspaper west of the Mississippi River.

Soon after his arrival at the Democrat, he posed for the Arkansas Times May 1979 magazine cover with a helmet on his head and with a knife clenched between his teeth squatting atop a Gazette newspaper rack. Hussman seriously considered firing Starr for this unapproved action but in the end, only reprimanded him. Nevertheless, this photo set the tone for the bitter newspaper war that followed and foreshadowed that the battle was "to the death".

Starr was the field general for the Democrat during the 13-year-long newspaper war and wrote scathing commentaries about the Gazette on the editorial pages of the Democrat. The Democrat adopted a free classified ad program and switched from an afternoon to a morning paper in order to compete directly with the Gazette. The Gazette underwent a long decline and was passed through several owners before being purchased by Hussman in 1991 and folded into the Democrat operation to form the Arkansas Democrat-Gazette.

Starr played a major role in the passage of the Arkansas Freedom of Information Act which was praised as a model sunshine law at the time of its passage.

Starr stepped down as managing editor in 1992. He continued to write a daily column through the late 1990s when he reduced his output to three days a week. During this time, Starr was very critical of Bill Clinton in his columns. Starr had supported Clinton during his early years as Governor of Arkansas but became very critical after Starr claimed that Clinton had lied to him about a story.

During Clinton's election bids, Starr often made appearances on national political programs to comment about his experiences covering Clinton during his Arkansas years. Starr's last columns focused on calling for the resignation of Arkansas Razorbacks basketball coach Nolan Richardson.

Later when Starr was in the hospital after heart surgery, Richardson sent him flowers. This completely changed the way Starr wrote about Richardson from then on.

== Personal life ==
John Robert Starr died of a heart attack while on vacation at Del Norte, Colorado. His son is Robert "Rusty" Starr who is publisher of the Palatka Daily News in Palatka, Florida.

== Books ==
- Yellow Dogs and Dark Horses: Thirty Years on the Campaign Beat with John Robert Starr, (ISBN 0-87483-030-3), by John Robert Starr, published by August House.

== Quotes ==
- "James Carville, the Cajun cur who will say anything, do anything to help Clinton. He's not in the media, but he is a mean machine. Carville called Paula Jones 'trailer camp trash,' a commodity with which he has had much experience." - on James Carville
- These characters knew the truth about Gennifer Flowers in 1992 and helped Clinton lie to the nation. He is lying again, and they are lying for him again. - on White House Aides

== Quotes about ==
- Anyone who said he was not afraid of John R. Starr is a liar. - Ben Pollock

Adapted from the article John Robert Starr, from Wikinfo, licensed under the GNU Free Documentation License.

"John Robert was as tenacious a friend as he was a foe. In good and bad times alike, I always knew him to speak his mind and say exactly what he felt. That kind of candor can be strong medicine, but I learned to respect him for it. His legion of readers might not always agree with his point of view, but they read what he had to say." President Bill Clinton released this statement from the White House upon hearing of Starr's death in April 2000.
