= Rex Nelson =

American journalist and political appointee

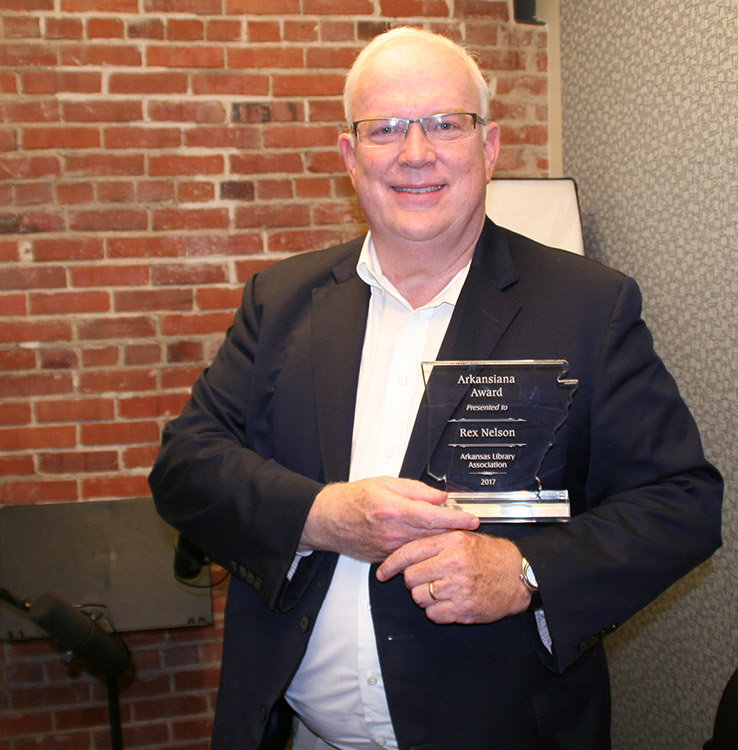
- Nelson receiving a library award
- Born: September 2, 1959 (age 66); Arkadelphia, Arkansas, U.S.
- Education: Ouachita Baptist University
- Occupations: Journalist, columnist, author, broadcaster, political appointee
- Employer: Arkansas Democrat-Gazette
- Spouse: Melissa Garcia Nelson
- Children: 2

Rex Nelson (born September 2, 1959) is an American journalist, columnist, author, sports broadcaster, and former political appointee. He is a senior editor and columnist for the Arkansas Democrat-Gazette and is known for writing about Arkansas history, politics, food, culture, and rural communities.

Nelson previously served as director of policy and communications for Arkansas governor Mike Huckabee and was appointed by President George W. Bush to the Delta Regional Authority in 2005. He is also the longtime radio voice of Ouachita Baptist University football.

== Early life and education ==
Nelson was born in Arkadelphia, Arkansas, on September 2, 1959, to Robert "Red" Nelson and Carolyn Caskey Nelson. He grew up in Arkadelphia's Ouachita Hills neighborhood, near the Ouachita Baptist University campus and the Ouachita River. His parents, both former teachers, later operated a sporting-goods store in downtown Arkadelphia.

Nelson graduated from Arkadelphia High School in 1978. While in high school, he began his journalism career with a local radio show. He attended Ouachita Baptist University, where he worked as sports editor of the Daily Siftings Herald, served as sports director for local radio stations KVRC-AM and KDEL-FM, and became a play-by-play announcer for Ouachita football and men's basketball games.

Nelson graduated from Ouachita in December 1981. Other institutional biographies have described him as a 1982 alumnus of the university. The White House later described him as graduating summa cum laude with a bachelor's degree in communications and a minor in political philosophy.

== Journalism career ==
After graduating from Ouachita, Nelson worked as a sportswriter for the Arkansas Democrat before returning to Arkadelphia to become editor of the Daily Siftings Herald. At age twenty-three, he was the youngest editor of a daily newspaper in Arkansas. In 1983, he became news and sports director for Arkadelphia-based radio stations KVRC-KDEL.

Nelson returned to the Arkansas Democrat in 1985 as assistant sports editor. About a year later, editor John Robert Starr selected him as the newspaper's Washington, D.C., correspondent. In January 1991, Nelson became editor of Arkansas Business. In 1992, he joined the Arkansas Democrat-Gazette as its first political editor, supervising reporters in Little Rock and Washington during Bill Clinton's first presidential campaign and early presidency. He also hosted the Response to Rush program on KARN-FM.

Nelson returned to the Arkansas Democrat-Gazette in June 2017 as senior editor and columnist. His columns often focus on Arkansas history, small towns, foodways, culture, politics, and rural development.

== Government and public affairs ==
In July 1996, Nelson joined the administration of Governor Mike Huckabee as director of policy and communications. In that role, he served on Huckabee's senior management team, supervised media relations, speechwriting, and strategic planning, and worked on Huckabee's reelection campaigns.

In 2005, President George W. Bush announced his intention to appoint Nelson as alternate federal co-chairperson of the Delta Regional Authority. Nelson served at the authority for nearly four years, working on regional economic development issues in states along the lower Mississippi River.

After leaving federal service, Nelson joined The Communications Group in Little Rock as senior vice president for government relations and public outreach. In 2011, he was named president of Arkansas' Independent Colleges and Universities, an association of the state's private accredited higher-education institutions. In 2015, he became director of corporate community relations for Simmons First National Corporation.

== Broadcasting and Ouachita Baptist University ==
Nelson has served for decades as the radio voice of Ouachita Baptist University football. In 2015, Ouachita named the Rex Nelson Radio Booth in the Dunklin Family Press Box at Cliff Harris Stadium in his honor. He received Ouachita's Alumni Milestone Award in 2012.

== Writing and Arkansas culture ==
Nelson began publishing his blog, Rex Nelson's Southern Fried, in July 2009. The blog focuses on Arkansas and Southern food, culture, football, history, and travel. In 2016, Butler Center Books published Southern Fried: Going Whole Hog in a State of Wonder, a collection of Nelson's columns and essays about Arkansas.

Nelson also helped found the Little Rock Touchdown Club and the Arkansas Food Hall of Fame. He has served on boards including the Arkansas Sports Hall of Fame, the Arkansas Natural and Cultural Resources Council, the Arkansas Humanities Council, the National Food and Beverage Foundation, the Pryor Center for Arkansas Oral and Visual History, the Arkansas Travelers professional baseball club, the Historic Arkansas Museum Commission, and the Arkansas Cinema Society.

== Awards and recognition ==
In 1994, Arkansas Business named Nelson to its "40 Under 40" list.

In 2016, Nelson was inducted into the Arkansas Sportscasters and Sportswriters Hall of Fame. That same year, Governor Asa Hutchinson, the Arkansas Economic Development Commission's Division of Rural Services, and the Arkansas Rural Development Commission named him Arkansas Rural Advocate of the Year.

In 2023, Nelson was selected to receive the Arkansas Press Association's Journalism Educator Award.

== Personal life ==
Nelson married Melissa Garcia on October 14, 1989. They have two sons and live in Little Rock.

== Bibliography ==
- The Hillary Factor: The Story of America's First Lady with Philip Martin. Gallen Publishing Group, 1993.
- Giving Until It Feels Good: Ben M. Elrod: Arkansas Educator and Fundraiser with Ian Cosh. 2016.
- Southern Fried: Going Whole Hog in a State of Wonder. Butler Center Books, 2016.
