= Christopher C. Danley =

American soldier, politician and journalist (1818–1865)

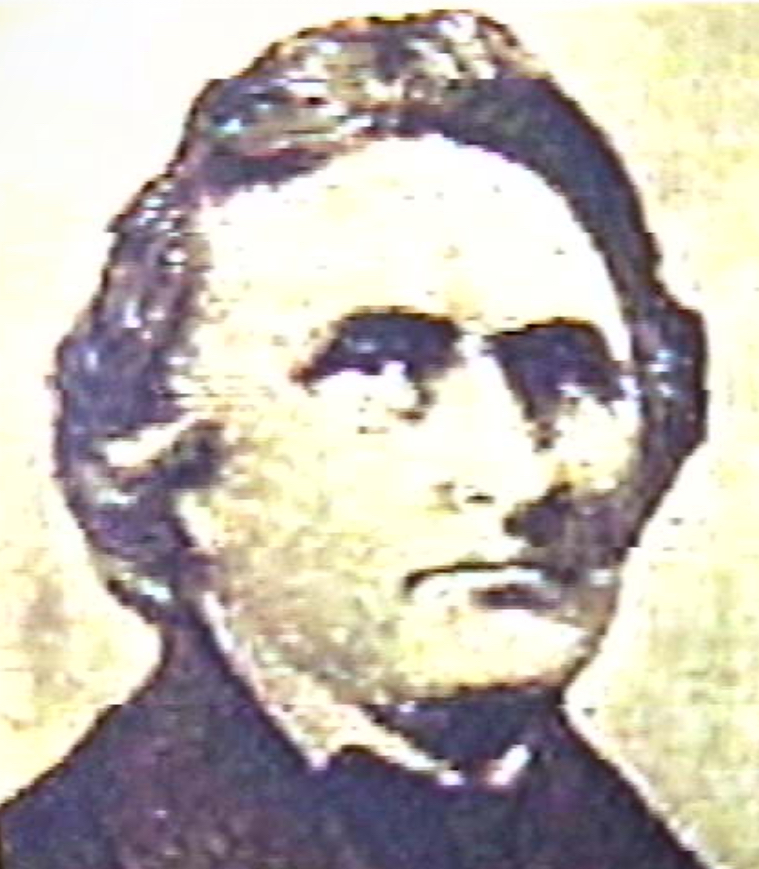

Member of the Arkansas Senate
- In office 1861 – October 3, 1865

2nd Arkansas State Auditor
- In office 1849–1855
- Preceded by: Elias Nelson Conway
- Succeeded by: William Read Miller (acting)

Personal details
- Born: Christopher Columbus Danley; 1818
- Died: October 3, 1865 (aged 46–47) Gazette Building, Little Rock, Arkansas, US

Military service
- Rank: Captain
- Battles/wars: Mexican–American War; Texas Revolution; Mier Expedition; American Civil War

Christopher Columbus Danley (1818 – October 3, 1865) was an American soldier, journalist and politician from Arkansas.

== Early life and military career ==
Born 1818, Danley came from a Missouri family, and received little education. As a child, he worked as a mail carrier between Little Rock and Van Buren, and as a bartender for the Anthony House.

Danley was accepted into the United States Military Academy, but chose not to attend. He enlisted into the United States Army in June 1846, and served under Archibald Yell and Albert Pike, being ranked captain. He was captured by the Mexican Army, but he escaped. He also served in the Army of the Republic of Texas during the Texas Revolution, and fought in the Mier expedition.

During the American Civil War, Danley was a member of the Arkansas Military Board, alongside Henry Rector. In 1861, he and Thomas James Churchill were sent north to purchase munitions.

== Journalism and politics ==
Danley was an editor of the Arkansas Gazette, having bought the newspaper from William E. Woodruff in March 1853, and member of the Democratic Party, which was pro-slavery. He later abandoned the party along with fellow former Confederate officers Albert Pike and Solon Borland, claiming the party had become abolitionist. They joined the Know Nothing party in October 1855. He used his newspaper to promote the party.

In 1849, Danley defeated Elias Nelson Conway in the election for Arkansas State Auditor, serving until resigning in 1855. In 1858, he was elected to the Arkansas Senate, serving until his death in office on October 3, 1865, aged 46 or 47, at the Gazette Building in Little Rock, Arkansas.
