= Rose Building (Little Rock, Arkansas) =

- U.S. National Register of Historic Places
- U.S. Historic district – Contributing property
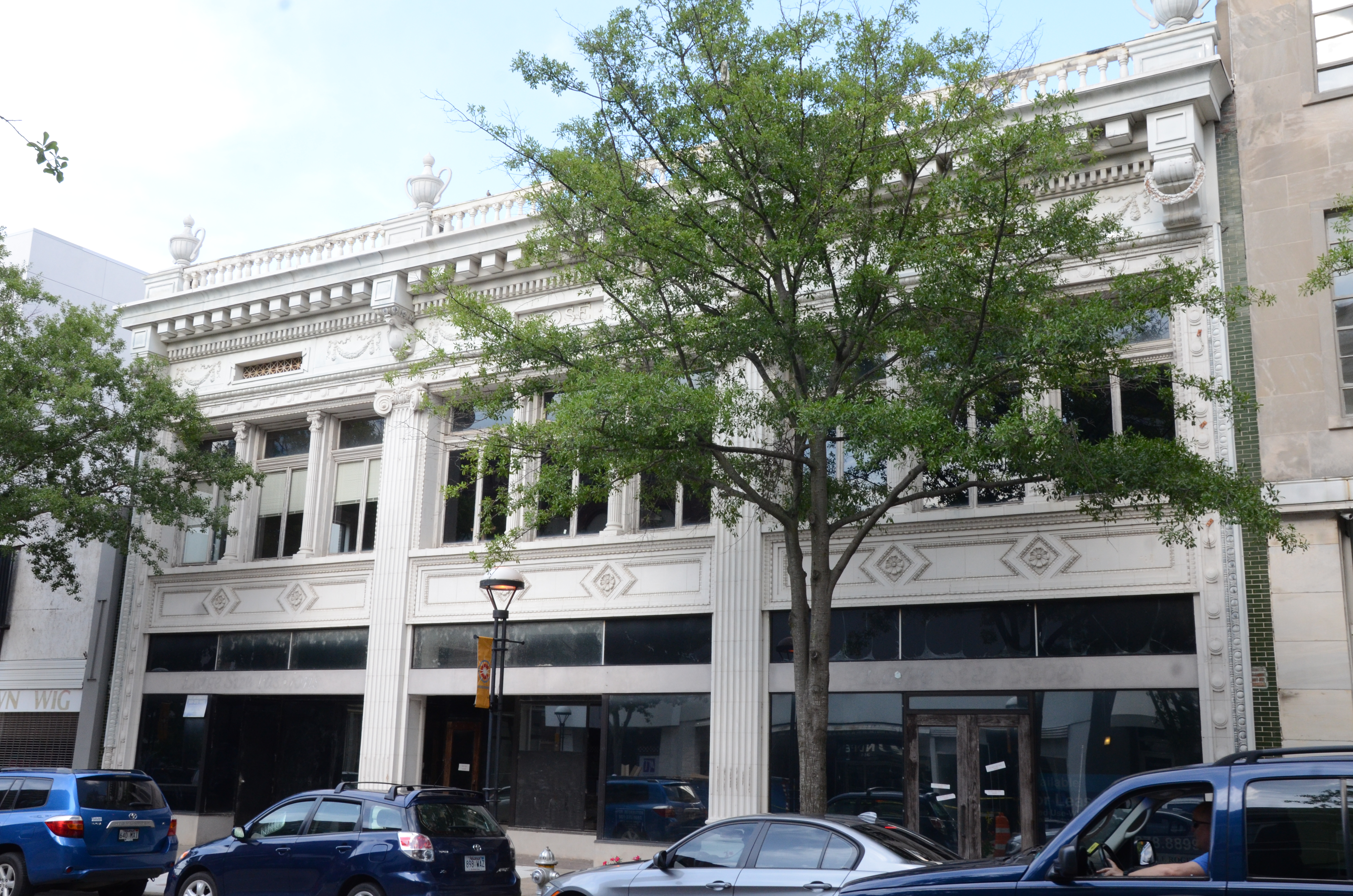

- Location within Arkansas Location within the United States
- Location: 307 Main St., Little Rock, Arkansas
- Coordinates: 34°44′43″N 92°16′13″W
- Built: 1900
- Architect: George R. Mann
- Architectural style: Classical Revival
- Part of: Main Street Commercial District (ID10000396)
- MPS: Little Rock Main Street MRA
- NRHP reference No.: 86003119

Significant dates
- Added to NRHP: November 13, 1986
- Designated CP: June 25, 2010

The Rose Building is a historic commercial building at 307 Main Street in Little Rock, Arkansas. It was built in 1900 from the plans of George R. Mann, and is named for Arkansas Supreme Court Chief Justice U. M. Rose. It is a prominent local example of commercial Classical Revival architecture. The building was built originally as an office property and by the early to mid twentieth century housed retail when the city's Main Street was the major shopping district. Rose purchased three lots on the Peyton Block of Main Street by 1880. Judge Rose built two preexisting Rose Buildings, both destroyed by fire on the current location. The existing structure is a 1916 incarnation of the Rose Building built by Rose's son. It is vastly different from the previous two structures. The two-story structure now displays a symmetrically massed Neoclassical façade, designed by George R. Mann. Mann was the architect who designed the existing Arkansas State Capitol and the Mann on Main mentioned above. It was later home to retail users in the mid twentieth century, two long term tenants were Allsopp-Chappell, a local bookstore, and Moses Melody shop. It had a myriad of occupants by the later part of the century, one being Gold's House of Fashions, in which the structure underwent a renovation. It was added to the National Register of Historic Places in 1986.

The building is currently owned by a private investment group, which acquired it in 2002. It has been redeveloped by the national CRE investments and development organization, The Lasiter Group, the asset's owner. The 20,000 square foot building is fully redeveloped.

The overall project encompasses both commercial and residential components, consisting of two restaurants in the building's ground floor, as well as 11 apartment units, consisting of 10 residential units upstairs and 1 ground floor unit.

== See also ==
- National Register of Historic Places listings in Little Rock, Arkansas
