= St. Vincent's Hospital (Normandy, Missouri) =

Defunct hospital in Missouri, U.S.

- U.S. National Register of Historic Places
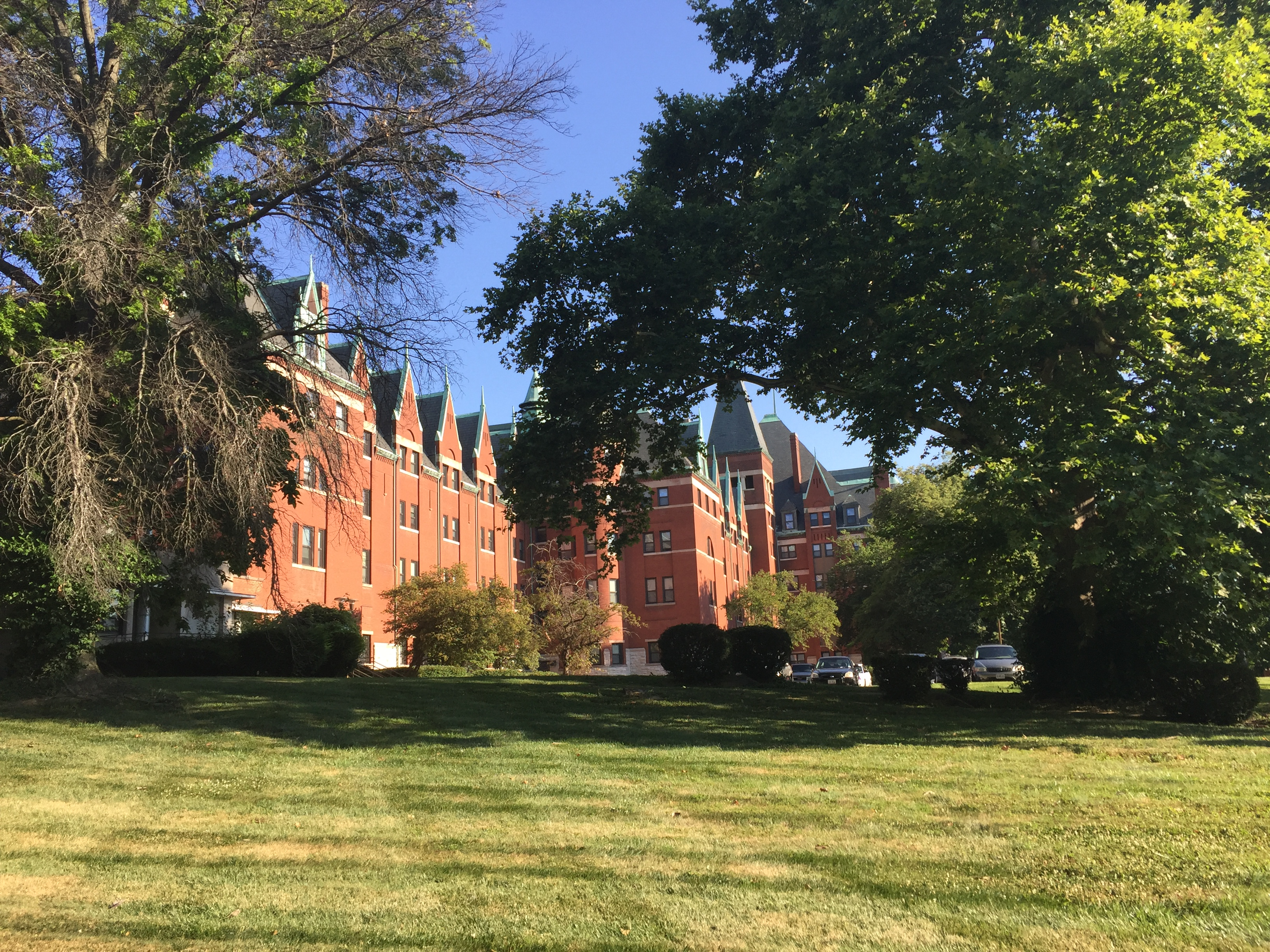

- Location within St. Louis
- Location: 1600 Castle Park Drive; Normandy, Missouri
- Coordinates: 38°41′33″N 90°18′24″W
- Built: 1893
- Architect: George R. Mann; Harvey Ellis
- Architectural style: Renaissance
- NRHP reference No.: 82004722
- Added to NRHP: April 12, 1982

St. Vincent's Hospital was a Catholic hospital in Normandy, Missouri.

In 1858, the Sisters of Charity founded St. Vincent's Sanitarium for those with nervous and mental diseases. The hospital was located on St. Vincent's Lane north of St. Charles Rock Road; it is the current home of the Castle Park Apartments.

It opened in August 1858 at Ninth and Marion Streets in St. Louis with four patients and fifteen sisters.

In 1895, the home relocated to St. Vincent's Lane (the current Castle Park Drive), up a hilltop from the Rock Road in St. Louis County. This massive, castle-like building is listed on the National Register of Historic Places.

The 1930 U.S. Census lists 357 individuals.

The home was in part financed by the patients' fees. By 1941, the home was operated by the Daughters of Charity of St. Vincent de Paul for the treatment of mental and nervous disorders as well as selected cases of alcoholism and drug addiction. The home remained in existence until the 1980s.

The census collection consists of three record books of the St. Vincent's Institution for the Insane: cash ledger, 1858–1867; contracts of obligations for patients, 1859–circa 1890; and record of doctors' prescriptions for patients, 1901–1904.
