= Arkansas Democrat-Gazette =

Daily newspaper in Arkansas, US

- The front page of the Wednesday, July 27, 2005 issue of the Arkansas Democrat-Gazette
- Type: Daily newspaper
- Format: Broadsheet
- Owner: WEHCO Media, Inc.
- Publisher: Walter E. Hussman, Jr.
- Editor: Eliza Hussman Gaines, managing editor
- Founded: Democrat: 1878; Gazette: 1819; Democrat-Gazette: 1991
- Headquarters: 121 East Capitol Avenue; Little Rock, Arkansas 72201; US
- Circulation: 2,308 Average print circulation 49,800 Digital Subscribers
- ISSN: 1060-4332
- OCLC number: 50767083
- Website: arkansasonline.com

The Arkansas Democrat-Gazette is the newspaper of record in the U.S. state of Arkansas, printed in Little Rock with a northwest edition published in Lowell. It is distributed for sale in all 75 of Arkansas's counties.

By virtue of one of its predecessors, the Arkansas Gazette (founded in 1819), it claims to be the oldest continuously published newspaper west of the Mississippi River. The original print shop of the Gazette is preserved at the Historic Arkansas Museum in Little Rock.

== History ==
=== Early years ===
The history of the Arkansas Democrat-Gazette goes back to the earliest days of territorial Arkansas. William E. Woodruff arrived at the territorial capital at Arkansas Post in late 1819 on a dugout canoe with a second-hand wooden press. He cranked out the first edition of the Arkansas Gazette on November 20, 1819, 17 years before Arkansas became a state. The Gazette scrupulously avoided political involvement or endorsement early in its history.

In 1821, the territorial capital was moved to Little Rock, and Woodruff moved his Gazette along with it. The Gazette led the campaign for Arkansas statehood, accomplished in 1836, and constantly promoted new immigration.

The Gazette supported Texas independence and called for volunteers from Arkansas to assist the Texans and supported the Mexican–American War. In the 1840s, Woodruff lost control of the paper and established a competing paper, the Arkansas Democrat (unrelated to the later Democrat).

In 1855, editor Christopher C. Danley and Solon Borland took ownership of the newspaper, turning it into a mouthpiece for the Know Nothing party.

=== American Civil War era ===
The Gazette struggled through the early American Civil War, facing financial problems and shortages of supplies. The Gazette had initially been pro-United States but altered its position after U.S. President Abraham Lincoln called for a 75,000-man militia, much like Arkansas.

In 1863, U.S. troops recaptured Little Rock, and the Gazette suspended publication until May 1865, while U.S. authorities used the presses for publications.

=== Competition after the Civil War ===
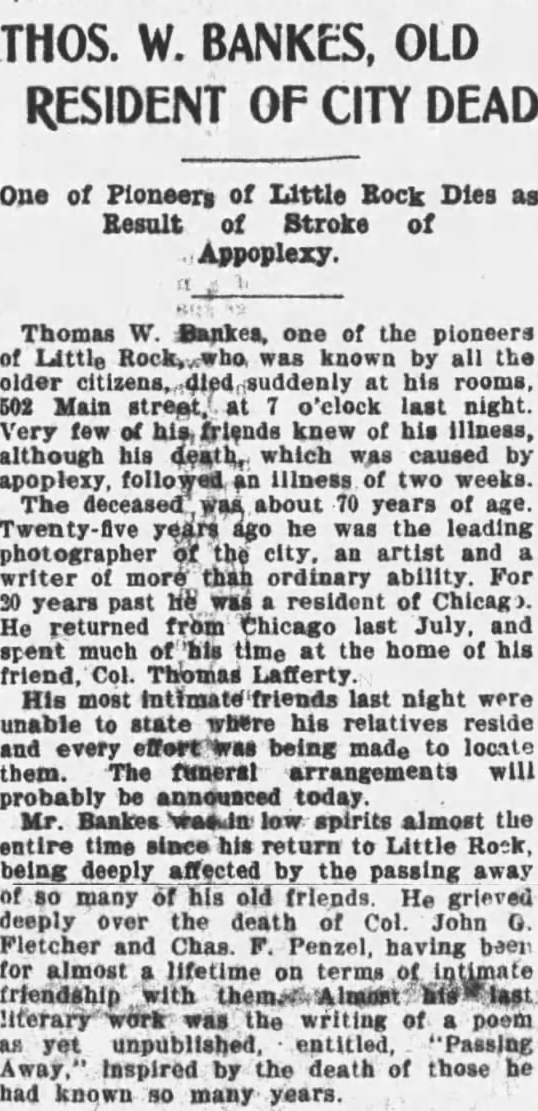
Obituary of artist Thomas W. Bankes in the Gazette on 29 March 1906.

During Reconstruction, a competitor arose by various names, under various editors, and with several different owners. In 1878, J.N. Smithee bought the newspaper, changed its name to the Arkansas Democrat, and went after lucrative state printing contracts held by the Gazette.

The Gazette and the Democrat exchanged words that soon escalated into an exchange of gunfire between the owner of the Democrat and a part-owner of the Gazette.

Over the years, the Gazette and the Democrat supported opposing candidates and took opposite editorial positions. The Gazette remained the dominant state newspaper throughout the simmering battle. The Gazette was owned and edited by John Netherland Heiskell, who guided it with a firm hand through most of the 20th century.

In 1926, August Engel acquired a significant interest in the Democrat. He became the newspaper's president and general manager, leading it through substantial growth over the next 43 years. Engel gained a reputation as a hard-working, shrewd businessman who actively participated in the editorial process.

=== Central High crisis ===
The Gazette took a strong editorial stance against Governor Orval Faubus when he tried to prevent the Little Rock Nine from integrating Little Rock Central High School in 1957. In 1958 the Gazette was awarded the Pulitzer Prize for Public Service for its stand; executive editor Harry Ashmore won the Pulitzer Prize for Editorial Writing. This was the first time in history that a newspaper won two Pulitzer Prizes within the same year. Despite its honors, the circulation of the Gazette dropped during the crisis due to boycotts, which ended when Ashmore left the paper.

The Democrat charted a generally neutral editorial stand. Its photographer Will Counts took several important pictures of the crisis, including a famous photo of Elizabeth Eckford, one of the Nine, being shouted at by an angry white girl, later identified as Hazel Massery; the Associated Press declared it to be one of the top 100 photos of the 20th century. Counts also helped arrange the public reconciliation of Eckford and Massery in 1997.

Counts' work submitted by the Arkansas Democrat for the 1958 Pulitzer Prize received the unanimous recommendation of the Pulitzer jurors for Best Spot News Photography. However, Counts was denied the award when the Pulitzer board overruled its jurors and gave the award to another entrant which portrayed a different local police force as friendly to its citizens.

In 2005, the Democrat-Gazette editorial cartoonist John Deering and his wife Cathy created a bronze sculpture of the Nine, entitled Testament, on the grounds of the Arkansas State Capitol.

=== The newspaper war ===
Heiskell died in 1972, and his family continued to run the Gazette. In 1974, the Democrat was sold to WEHCO Media Inc., owned by the Hussman family. Walter E. Hussman Jr., 27, became the publisher. At the time of Hussman's arrival, the morning Gazette was far in front of the afternoon Democrat, with daily circulation 118,702 to the Democrat's 62,405. Hussman embarked on a campaign of significant cost reductions and concentrated subscription efforts on the Little Rock urban market. These efforts had little success. By 1977, Hussman attempted to reach an agreement with the Gazette to combine operations, but his overtures were rejected.

Hussman vigorously fought back and intended to make the Democrat the state's largest newspaper. A war ensued between the two papers. The Democrat expanded its news operation, offered free classified advertisements, and switched from afternoon to morning publication.

In 1979, Hussman appointed John Robert Starr to managing editor. The fiery and irascible Starr temperament and intent in the upcoming circulation war was humorously illustrated by a cover story in the monthly magazine Arkansas Times showing Starr squatting atop a Gazette newspaper box with a dagger between his teeth to show his seriousness. Starr doubled the size of the news staff and concentrated on hard news. Under Starr's direction, readership increased steadily. During 1980, the Democrat was the fastest-growing newspaper in the United States.

The Gazette responded by hiring new staff, going to a color format, and filing a federal antitrust suit against the Democrat in 1984. The lawsuit accused the Hussman enterprises of predatory practices and trying to harm the Gazette. The Democrat responded that it was only trying to gain market share to be more competitive with the larger and more dominant Arkansas Gazette.

A federal jury in the court of U.S. District Judge William R. Overton rendered its verdict on March 26, 1986. The Democrat was found not guilty of all the allegations leveled against it by the Gazette.

The Heiskell family sold the Arkansas Gazette to Gannett, the nation's largest newspaper chain, on December 1, 1986.

Gannett had immense assets to fight the Democrat. However, it received criticism for bringing in out-of-town reporters and staff and losing the paper's local feel. The Gazette, nicknamed the "Old Lady", became flashier, but critics complained that the paper had lost the respect of the readership.

Over the next five years, the two newspapers dueled. The circulation of the Gazette remained steady over that period. Still, the daily circulation of the Democrat went from 81,000 to 131,000, and the Sunday circulation leaped ahead of the Gazette's 218,000 to achieve 230,000.

=== Victory of the Democrat ===
The financial losses of the fiercely contested battle were too much for Gannett to justify. On October 18, 1991, Gannett threw in the towel and sold the Gazette to WEHCO. The first edition of the Arkansas Democrat-Gazette rolled off the presses the following day, October 19. Regardless of which paper they subscribed to, most Arkansans were saddened by the sudden loss of their historic newspaper.

Many of the reporters and staff of the more liberal Gazette were thrown out of work and not picked up by the more conservative Democrat-Gazette. Many former employees were bitter at Gannett for managing the newspaper war and angry at the Democrat for achieving victory. Many of the "Old Lady's" employees left for other markets while some who remained aided in converting the Arkansas Times from a magazine format to a tabloid newspaper to provide a more liberal weekly alternative to the dominant conservative paper.

In the years since, the Arkansas Democrat-Gazette has maintained a higher circulation than newspapers in similarly sized cities. Many newspapers that defeated in-town rivals concentrated on reducing costs and reduced news coverage to meet their goals. The Arkansas Democrat-Gazette has continued to balance quality goals with profitability. Pulitzer Prize winner Paul Greenberg was appointed the Democrat-Gazette editorial page editor on April 29, 1992. A sixth-generation Arkansan, Griffin Smith was appointed Executive Editor on June 23, 1992. Smith retired on May 1, 2012. Managing editor David Bailey, who joined the paper in May 1993, took over leadership of the newsroom operation. Greenberg stepped down on August 1, 2015, and David Barham, who joined the paper in 2002, took over as editorial page editor.

=== Online ===
Before most other newspapers, the Democrat-Gazette implemented a website paywall in 2002. The newspaper credits the strategy with helping it stem declines in circulation, where it has fared much better than the industry at large since that time. Most other newspapers that implemented paywalls later had been operating popular free-access websites for years, leading to reader backlash. The Economist noted that the strategy is aided by its "virtual monopoly" over news in the region.

=== Digital conversion ===
The Democrat-Gazette ended print delivery of its Monday-Saturday papers statewide throughout 2018 and 2019 and transitioned to a digital replica edition. All subscribers were provided a new iPad to access the replica edition and one-on-one instruction, training, and technical assistance. The Sunday paper remains in traditional print circulation.

== See also ==
- Gazette Building (Little Rock, Arkansas)
