= George R. Mann Building =

- U.S. National Register of Historic Places
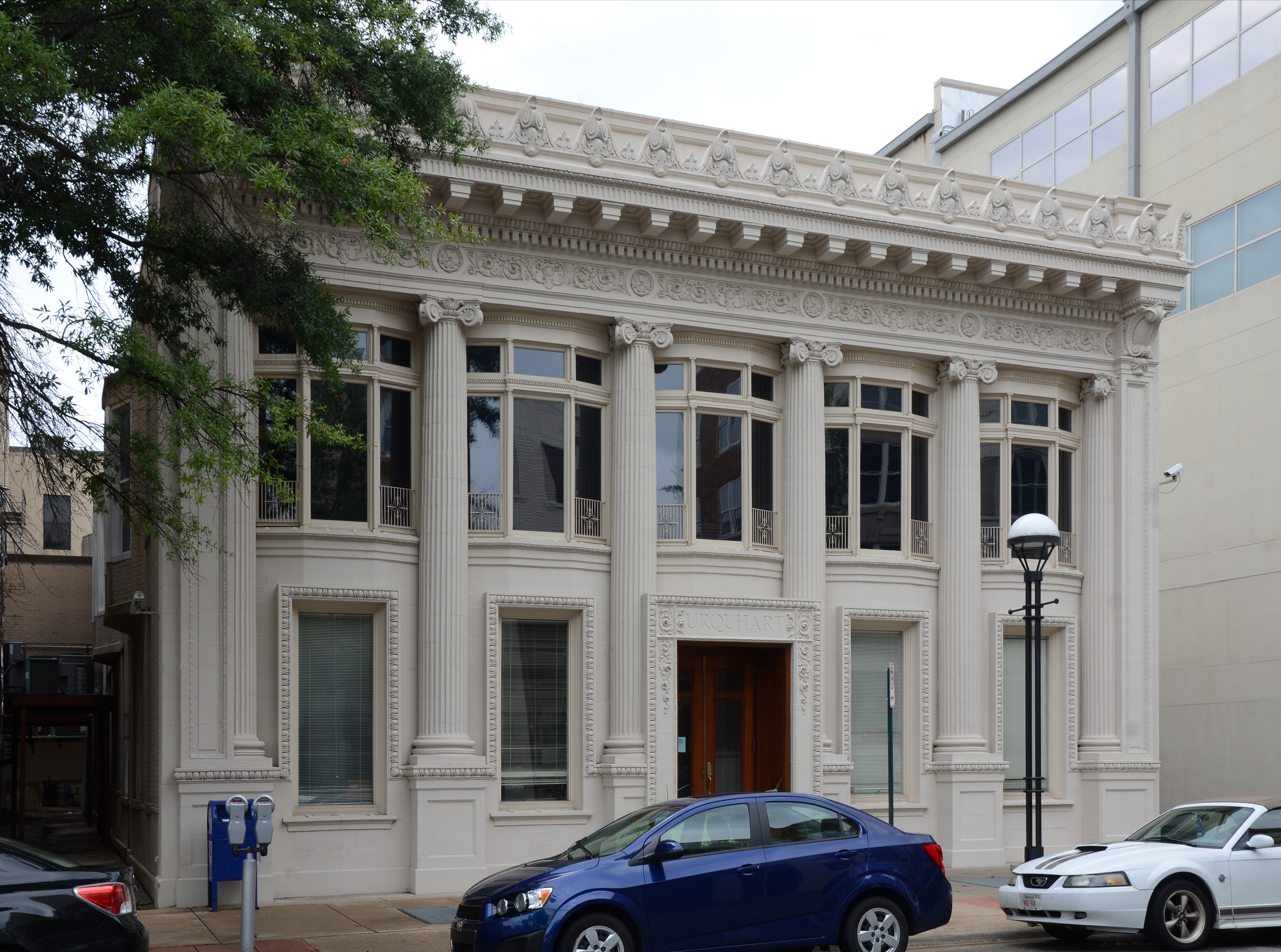

- Location within Arkansas Location within the United States
- Location: 115 E. 5th St., Little Rock, Arkansas
- Coordinates: 34°44′37″N 92°16′12″W
- Area: less than one acre
- Built: 1906
- Architect: George R. Mann
- Architectural style: Beaux Arts
- NRHP reference No.: 83003547
- Added to NRHP: December 29, 1983

The George R. Mann Building, also known as the Adkins Building, is a historic commercial building at 115 East 5th Street in Little Rock, Arkansas. Built in 1906 to a design by local architect George R. Mann, it is an important local example of Beaux Arts architecture, and served as the site of Mann's office until 1912. It also served as an office for other notable Little Rock professionals such as Dr. Frank Visonhaler, Dr. E. R. Dibrell and Dr. M. E. McCaskilI. Despite the building's comparatively modest scale, it has a monumental-appearing facade, with two-story fluted columns set on paneled stone posts, with angled Ionic capitals supporting a heavily carved entablature. A line of dentil moulding separates that from a projecting modillioned cornice topped by a series of cartouches, with a recessed parapet behind.

The building was listed on the National Register of Historic Places in 1983.

== See also ==
- National Register of Historic Places listings in Little Rock, Arkansas
