= Arkansas Times =

American weekly alternative newspaper

- Front page of the Arkansas Times for August 8, 2013
- Type: Alternative weekly
- Format: Tabloid
- Owner: Arkansas Times Limited Partnership
- Publisher: Alan Leveritt
- Editor: Austin Gelder
- Founded: 1974; 52 years ago
- Headquarters: 201 East Markham; Suite 200; Little Rock, Arkansas 72201; United States
- Circulation: 20,000 (as of 2024)
- ISSN: 0164-6273
- OCLC number: 1244220194
- Website: arktimes.com
- Free online archives: https://arktimes.com/issues

Arkansas Times, a weekly alternative newspaper based in Little Rock, Arkansas, United States, is a publication that has circulated more than 40 years, originally as a magazine.

== History ==
Founded as a small magazine on newsprint in 1977 by publisher Alan Leveritt, it later became a glossy monthly magazine with paid circulation, and in May 1992 became a weekly tabloid-format publication on newsprint with free distribution. As of 2019, the Times is once again a glossy monthly magazine.

Its current format stems from reaction to the Arkansas Democrat's buyout of assets from Gannett's closure of the Arkansas Gazette in 1991, which had resulted in the Arkansas Democrat-Gazette. The Arkansas Times's senior editor Max Brantley is among those former Gazette staffers who lost their jobs as a result of the merger. Brantley was the first editor of the weekly edition in May 1992. The Gazette's editorial cartoonist George Fisher became the Times cartoonist until his death.

Lindsey Millar became editor of the Times in 2011. He introduced a number of digital features, including a weekly public affairs podcast and a daily video headline program. He has expanded the newspaper's reporting reach by privately underwritten reporting projects on a major oil pipeline spill and an ongoing project on education in Arkansas. In 2023, Austin Gelder became editor-in-chief, replacing Lindsey Millar.

== Lawsuit ==
In 2018, the Times refused to sign a pledge not to boycott Israel, as required by the State's anti-BDS law, Act 710 for any company wishing to do business with state agencies. Consequently one of its advertisers, University of Arkansas – Pulaski Technical College, refused to renew its contract with the magazine. The Times in response sued the State in a case known as Arkansas Times LP v. Mark Waldrip claiming that its First Amendment rights had been violated. The case which was heard at the United States Court of Appeals for the Eighth Circuit was seen as principally important as it could have set a precedent for the application of other anti-BDS laws. On June 22, 2022 the United States Court of Appeals for the Eighth Circuit issued its decision holding that the law was constitutional and did not violate the First Amendment as it was intended to serve “purely commercial purposes."

== Logo ==
The icon used at the close of most articles and columns throughout the publication is the stylized face of a catfish. A larger version appears with a top hat and monocle at the top of the "Observer" column, typically found on Page 5 each week. The catfish is also seen in the newspaper's sign outside its building at Markham and Scott Streets in downtown Little Rock.

== See also ==
- List of newspapers in Arkansas
