= Fort Smith Masonic Temple =

- U.S. National Register of Historic Places
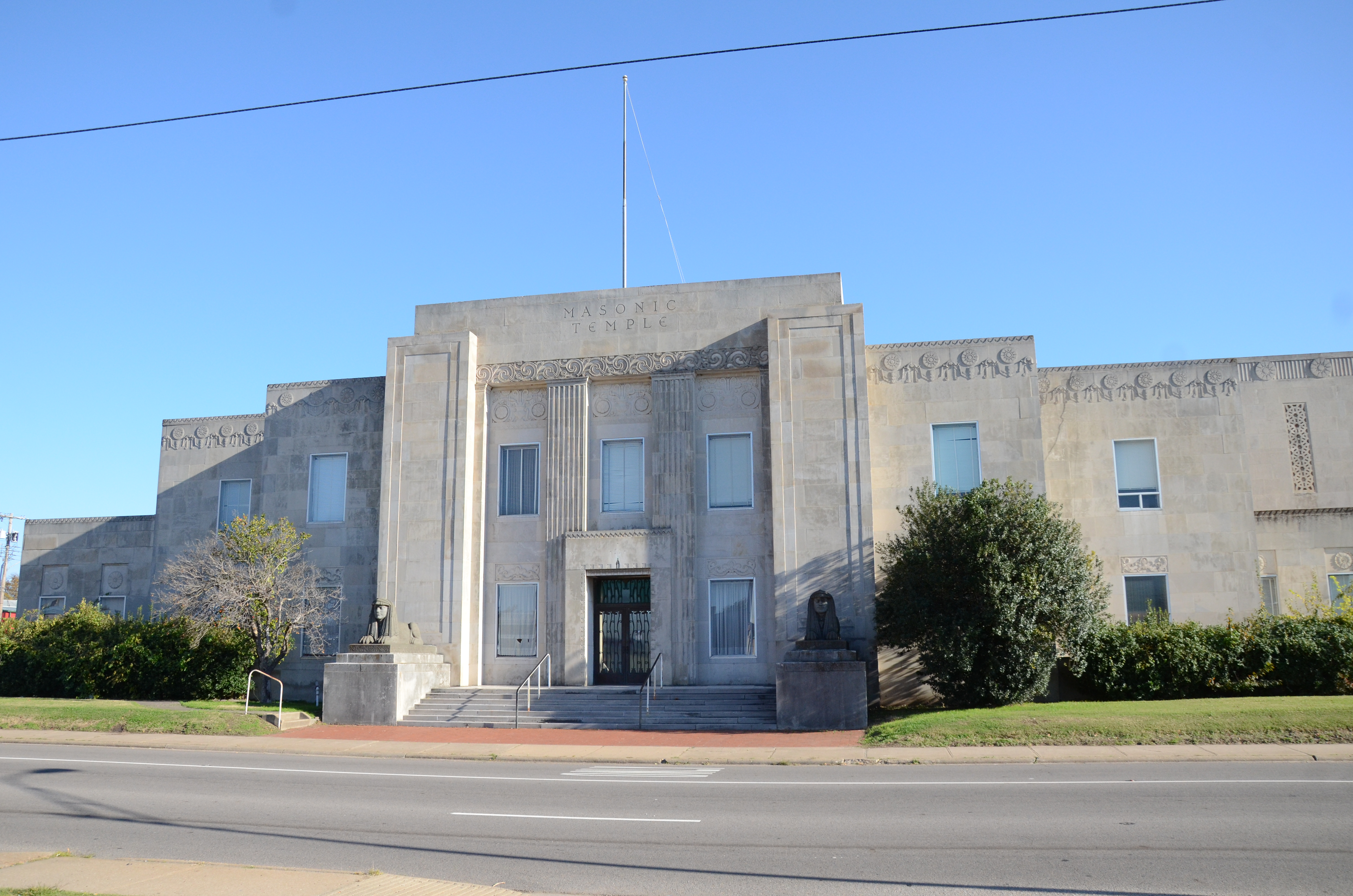

- Location within Arkansas Location within the United States
- Location: 200 N. 11th St., Fort Smith, Arkansas
- Coordinates: 35°23′9″N 94°25′6″W
- Area: 0.9 acres (0.36 ha)
- Architect: George R. Mann
- Architectural style: Art Deco, Exotic Revival, Egyptian Revival
- NRHP reference No.: 92001624
- Added to NRHP: November 20, 1992

The Fort Smith Masonic Temple is a historic 53,000 square foot building at 200 North 11th Street in Fort Smith, Arkansas. It is a large stone-walled structure, with styling that is an Art Deco-influenced version of Egyptian Revival architecture. Its main (northwest-facing) facade has a projecting central section, from which a series of bays are progressively stepped back, unified by a band of decorative carving at the top, just below the flat roof. The central portion has slightly projecting pilaster-like sections flanking three recessed bays, which are divided by two fluted pilasters and topped by decorative carved stonework and a panel identifying the building. The entrance is set in the center bay, recessed under a projecting square frame. The building was designed by Little Rock architect George R. Mann who also designed the Arkansas State Capitol and the Albert Pike Memorial Temple in Little Rock. The Fort Smith Scottish Rite Temple was completed in 1929. After completion it was occupied by the Western Arkansas Scottish Rite Bodies, Belle Point Lodge #20, Temple Lodge #755, Fort Smith's York Rite Bodies, Amrita Grotto, Multiple Eastern Star Chapters, Albert Pike DeMolay Chapter, International Order of Rainbow Girls Fort Smith Arkansas Assembly, and Faith Assembly.

On November 3rd 1930 in conjunction with Malco Theaters the Fort Smith Masonic Temple began to use its 800 seat auditorium as a movie theater. Its first movie was Joe Cook's "Rain or Shine." Eventually a marquee was constructed on the B Street side to advertise the movie currently playing. The 11th Street doors would serve as the entrance. Malco would use the auditorium for a number of decades before the contract was eventually abandoned and the temple eventually sold.

The Fort Smith Scottish Rite Temple is one of the few buildings in Arkansas to exhibit Egyptian Revival styling, which is particularly pronounced in the building's interior decoration.

The building was listed on the National Register of Historic Places in 1992.

Since 2017. It has become a concert venue called "Temple Live" and can seat 1,100 people.

In 2019, the temple has branched to two other locations, one in Wichita, Kansas and the other in Cleveland, Ohio.

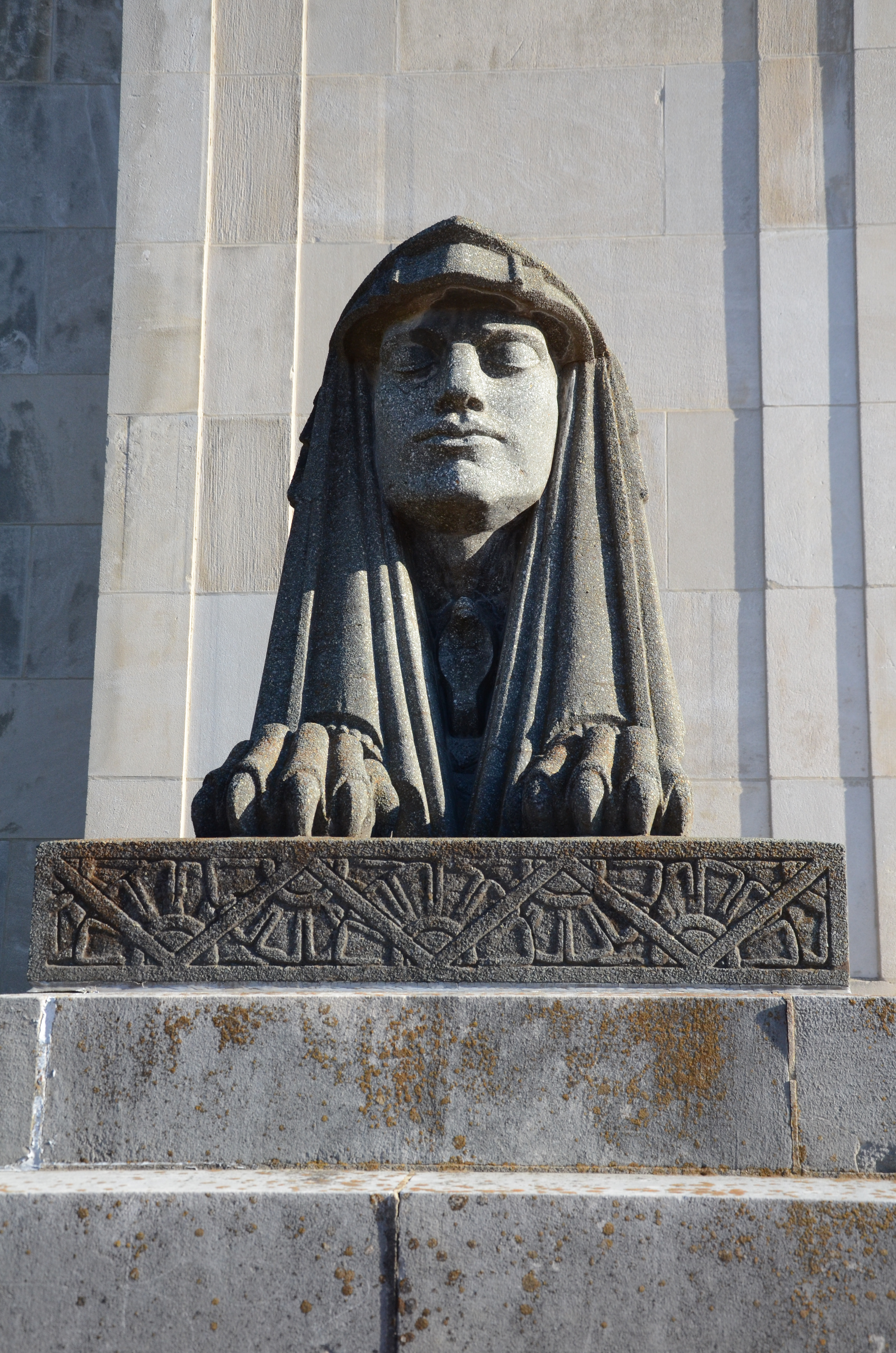
The sphinx at the masonic temple

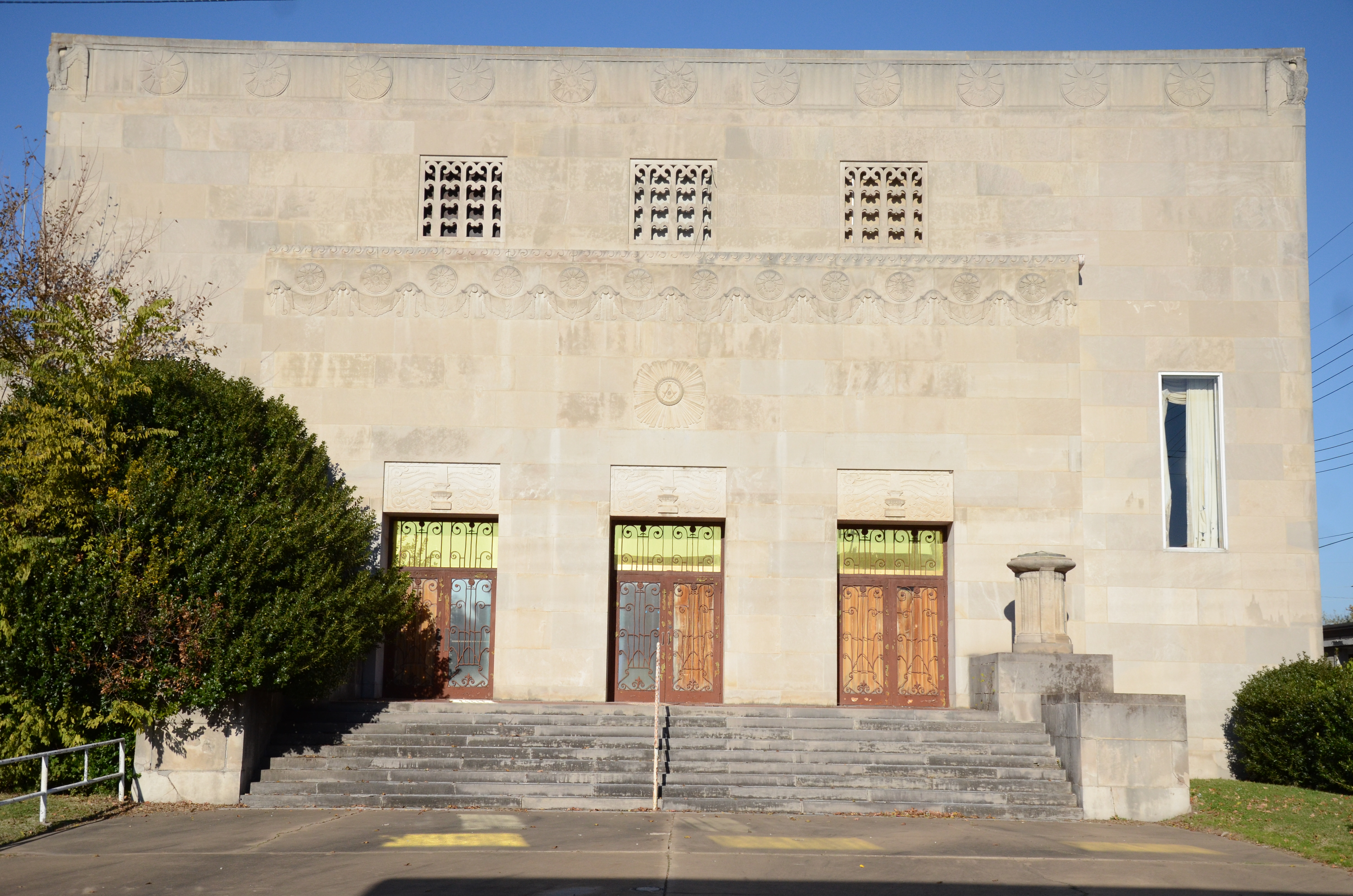
Masonic temple theatre entrance

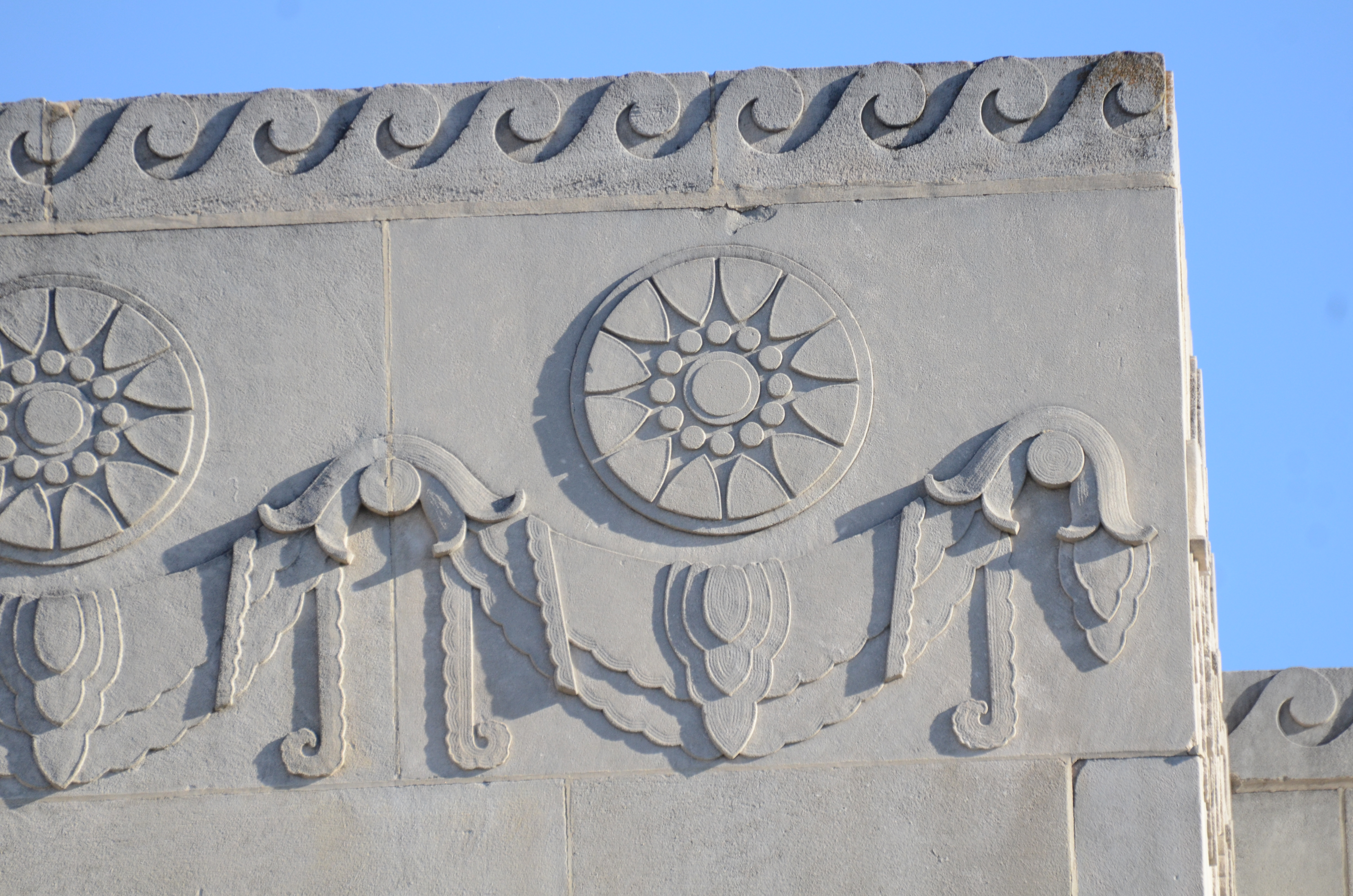
Carved wall at the masonic temple

== See also ==
- National Register of Historic Places listings in Sebastian County, Arkansas
