= Arkansas Game and Fish Commission =

State agency of Arkansas

Arkansas Game and Fish Commission (AGFC) is a state agency of Arkansas, headquartered in Little Rock, Arkansas.

The AGFC is important in keeping The Natural State true to its name. For more than 100 years, the agency has overseen the protection, conservation and preservation of various species of fish and wildlife in Arkansas. This is accomplished through habitat management, fish stocking, hunting and fishing regulations, and a host of other programs conducive to helping Arkansas’s wildlife flourish.

The AGFC is more than just managing the state’s wildlife and fisheries. An essential part of ensuring a healthy wildlife population involves people. Through agency programs geared toward the public, the Arkansas Game and Fish Commission works with the human element to generate awareness of ethical and sound management principles. Whether it be educational programs, fishing and hunting regulations, or environmental awareness, the agency understands that working with the people of Arkansas is just as important a factor in managing wildlife as any other aspect of conservation.

== See also ==
- Arkansas Constitutional Amendment 75
