= Albert Pike Residence Hotel =

Historic commercial building in Little Rock, Arkansas

- Albert Pike Hotel
- U.S. National Register of Historic Places
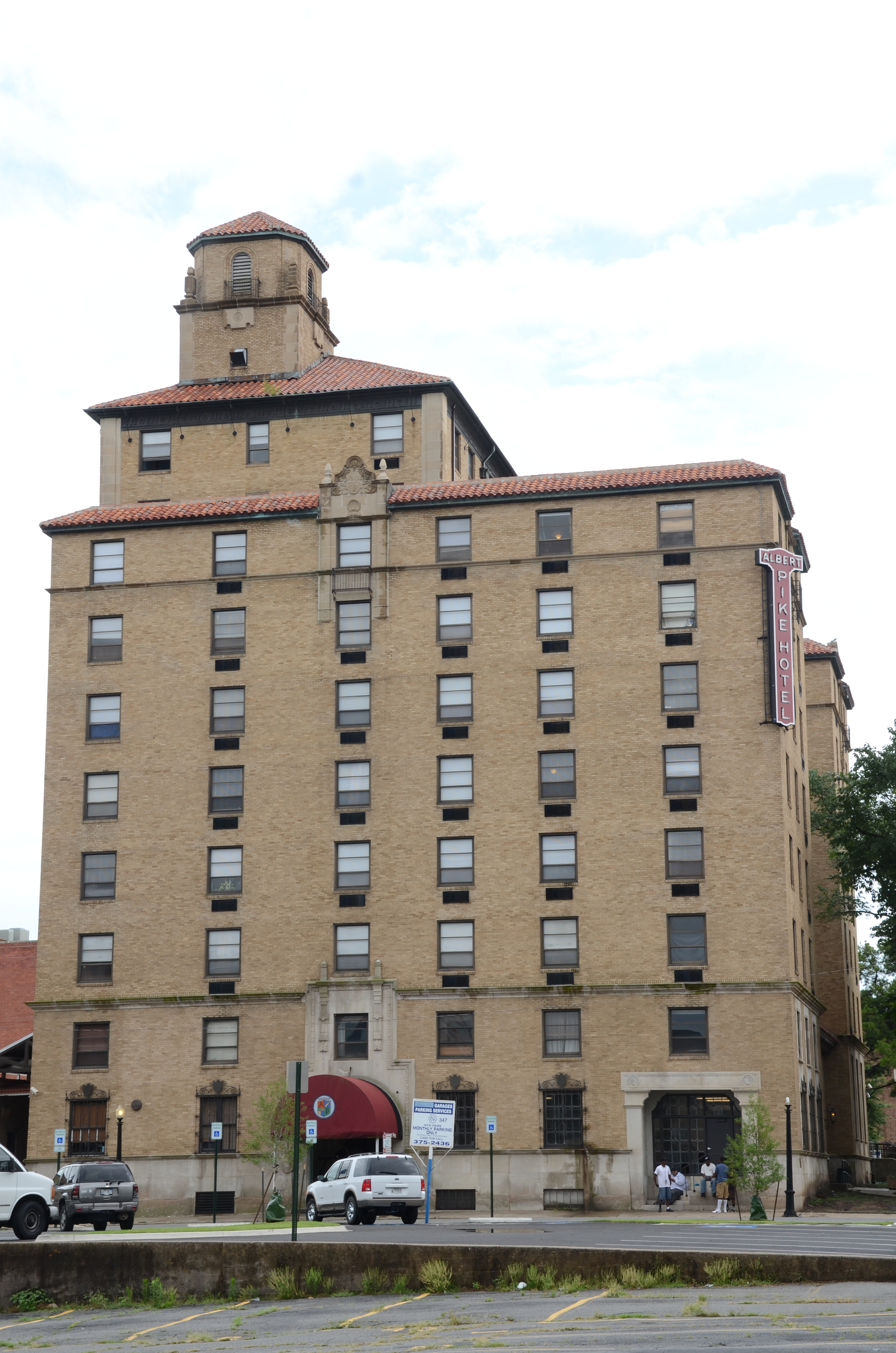
- The Albert Pike Residence Hotel.

- Location within Arkansas Location within the United States
- Location: 701 S. Scott St., Little Rock, Arkansas
- Coordinates: 34°44′30.28″N 92°16′11.39″W
- Built: 1929
- Architect: Eugene John Stern, George R. Mann
- Architectural style: Late 19th And 20th Century Revivals, Mission/spanish Revival
- NRHP reference No.: 78000625
- Added to NRHP: November 21, 1978

The Albert Pike Residence Hotel is a historic commercial building at 701 South Scott Street in Little Rock, Arkansas.

The hotel was built in 1929 by the Farrell Hotel Company at an approximate cost of $1,000,000. It was designed by architect Eugene John Stern in the Italian-Spanish Revival style. The two main wings are eight stories each, and extend out towards Scott Street. These two wings are connected across the back by a ten-story cross section. Decorated stone pediments extend above the roof line in the center of each wing. The cloister type porch graces the main entries which are flanked by triple arched leaded-glass windows. Above the entries are terra cotta medallions featuring heraldic shields with the initials "AP". The elaborate decor includes detailed stenciling, leaded and stained glass windows, extensive decorative tile, iron work, and ornate light fixtures. The coffered ceiling in the two story main lobby is overlooked by an open mezzanine floor that contains fine antique furnishings, including a custom made Hazelton Bros. grand piano, designed to match the building's interior structural features.

The hotel is named after one of Arkansas' leading historical figures, Albert Pike, a teacher, attorney, newspaperman, Confederate Brigadier General, and later a judge of the Arkansas Supreme Court. Pike was also a prominent member of the Freemasons, and his writings were officially embraced by the Scottish Rite appendant branch of that fraternity throughout much of the U.S. The building was a hotel from its construction in 1928 (opening in 1929) until December 1971, when the Second Baptist Church assumed ownership and began its Albert Pike Residence Hotel ministry. The purpose was to provide a family retirement community that was happy and uplifting.

In 1976 the hotel secured a Section 231 loan for $2,400,000 from the Department of Housing and Urban Development. This made possible the renovation of the hotel infrastructure bringing it up to current fire and safety standards.

The Albert Pike Hotel was entered into the National Register of Historic Places by the United States Department of the Interior in 1978. A grant from the Historical Preservation Society helped to restore the public and community areas to their original condition.

In late 1985, the hotel was purchased by a privately held corporation in Jonesboro, Arkansas. Since that time continuous upgrades, such as the addition of kitchen facilities, were made in efficiency, one, and two bedroom apartments. The apartments were created where two hotel rooms had connecting doors. Non connecting rooms are studio apartments with microwave-refrigerator combo units.

The North Lounge was restored in 1994 and was made a smoke-free environment. It provides a common activities room, television lounge, post office boxes, and library. Regular events are held to inform residents of health and community services available in the area, as well as weekly bingo, monthly birthday parties, and special occasion and holiday parties.

== See also ==
- National Register of Historic Places listings in Little Rock, Arkansas
