= Gazette Building =

- U.S. National Register of Historic Places
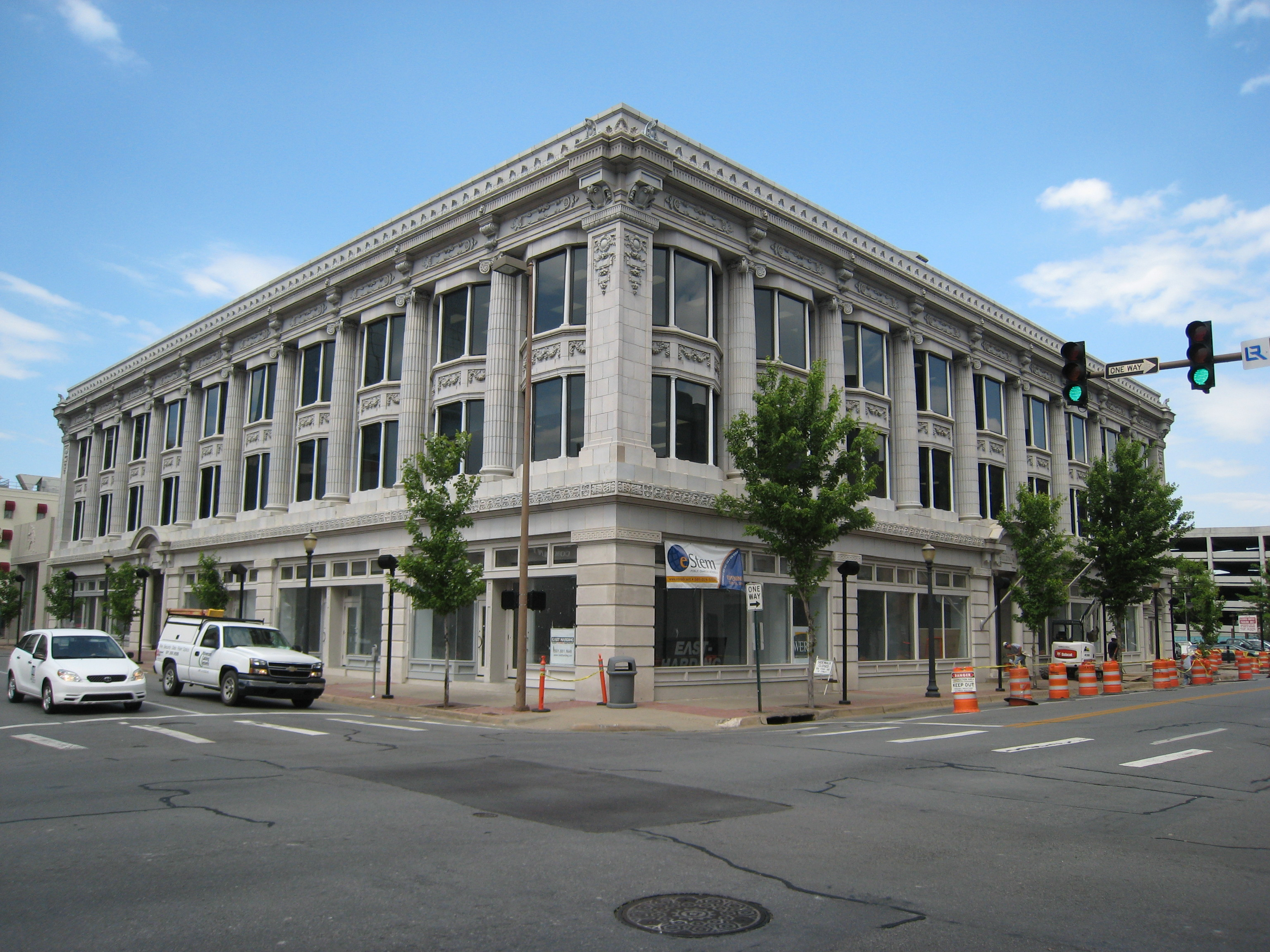
- The Gazette Building in Little Rock

- Location within Arkansas Location within the United States
- Location: 112 W. 3rd St., Little Rock, Arkansas
- Coordinates: 34°44′47″N 92°16′18″W
- Area: less than one acre
- Built: 1908
- Built by: Hotze, Peter
- Architect: George R. Mann
- NRHP reference No.: 76002239
- Added to NRHP: October 22, 1976

The Gazette Building in downtown Little Rock, Arkansas was built in 1908. It was designed by architect George R. Mann, and built by Peter Hotze. The building was listed on the U.S. National Register of Historic Places in 1976. Originally and for many years, the building served as the headquarters of the Arkansas Gazette newspaper. After the Gazette was sold and became the Arkansas Democrat-Gazette, the building served as the national campaign headquarters for the 1992 presidential campaign of Governor Bill Clinton. It now houses the Elementary and Middle Schools for eStem Public Charter Schools.

== See also ==
- National Register of Historic Places listings in Little Rock, Arkansas
