= William E. Woodruff (politician) =

Treasurer of Arkansas from 1836 to 1838

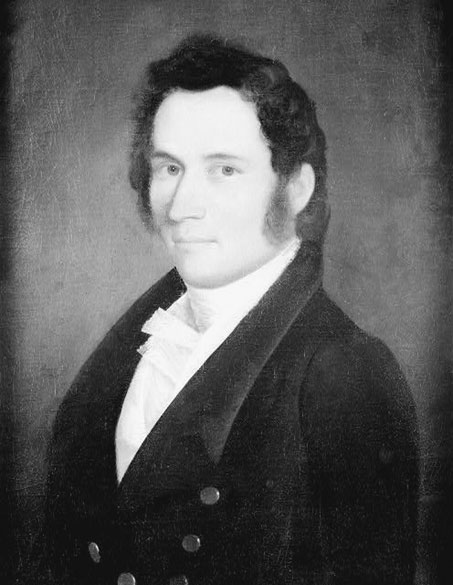
- Woodruff, c. 1830

10th Postmaster of Little Rock
- In office October 17, 1845 – September 3, 1846
- Nominated by: James K. Polk
- Preceded by: Barnett Williams
- Succeeded by: Lambert Reardon

1st Treasurer of Arkansas
- In office October 1, 1836 – November 20, 1838
- Preceded by: New office
- Succeeded by: John Hutt

Personal details
- Born: William Edward Woodruff; December 24, 1795 Suffolk County, New York, U.S.
- Died: June 19, 1885 (aged 89) Little Rock, Arkansas, U.S.
- Resting place: Mount Holly Cemetery, Little Rock, Arkansas, U.S. 34°44′15.3″N 92°16′42.5″W
- Party: Democratic
- Spouse: Jane Eliza Mills (m. 1827)
- Children: 11

William Edward Woodruff (December 24, 1795 – June 19, 1885) was an American politician and publisher who served as the first state treasurer of Arkansas from 1836 to 1838. He also served as the 10th postmaster of Little Rock from 1845 to 1846. Woodruff was the first publisher of a major Arkansas newspaper.

== Biography ==
Woodruff was born on December 24, 1795, in Suffolk County, New York. At age 14, he left formal schooling to become an apprentice for a Mr. Spooner of the Long Island Star in Brooklyn. He stayed for seven years before moving on to New York City as a journeyman pressman for T & J Swords.

In 1818, Woodruff headed west to work in Kentucky, Tennessee, and finally moving to the newly created Arkansas Territory, founding The Arkansas Gazette in October 1819. He published the Gazette from Arkansas Post for nearly two years while it was the seat of government, and moved to Little Rock when the capital was moved there. He left publishing in March 1853 with the sale of his newspaper to Christopher C. Danley.

On November 14, 1827, Woodruff married Jane Mills at the Stevenson House on 5th Street, between Cumberland and Rock streets; however, a bus station now occupies the block. The Historic Arkansas Museum with surviving buildings of the period lies two blocks north. They had 11 children, eight of whom survived into adulthood.

Woodruff was vocal in his support of the Confederacy during the American Civil War, but took no active part in fighting. Due to these loyalties, he was banished from Little Rock by the Union twice; once by General Steele and again by General Ord. His son, William E. Woodruff Jr., served as second captain of a battery called the Totten Artillery in honor of Dr. William Totten. Woodruff Jr. fled to Texas after the fall of Little Rock to Union forces.

Woodruff died in Little Rock on June 19, 1885, and is buried in the historic Mount Holly Cemetery. Woodruff County, Arkansas, is named for him.

Media offices
New office	Editor of The Arkansas Gazette; 1819–1838	Succeeded by Edward Cole
Preceded by George H. Burnett	Editor of The Arkansas Gazette; 1841–1843	Succeeded by Benjamin J. Borden
Preceded by George B. Hayden	Editor of The Arkansas Gazette; 1850–1853	Succeeded by Christopher C. Danley
Political offices
New office	Treasurer of Arkansas; 1836–1838	Succeeded by John Hutt
Preceded by Barnett Williams	Postmaster of Little Rock; 1845–1846	Succeeded by Lambert Reardon
