= Union Life Building =

- U.S. National Register of Historic Places
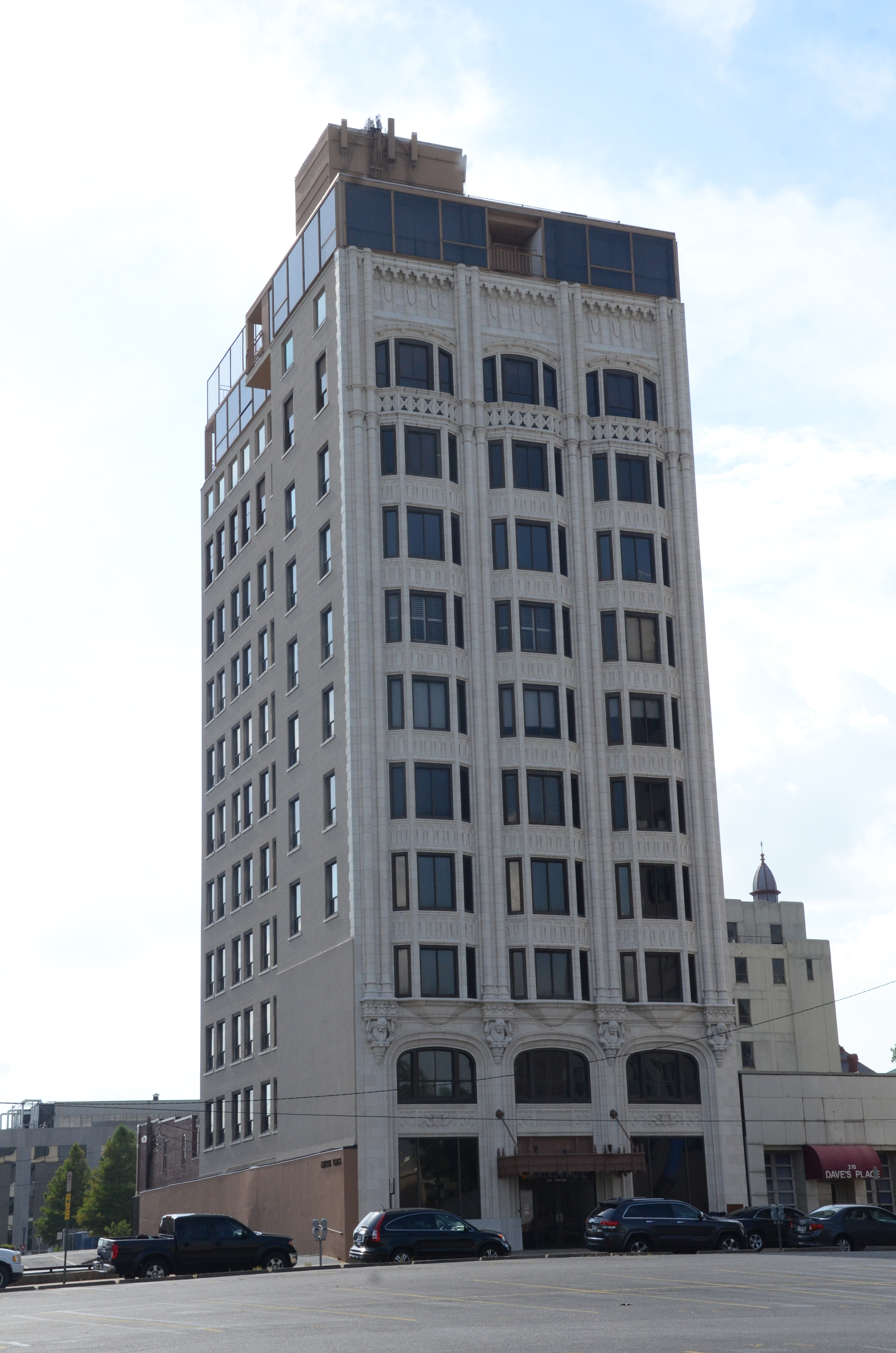

- Location within Arkansas Location within the United States
- Location: 212 Center St., Little Rock, Arkansas
- Coordinates: 34°44′49″N 92°16′23″W
- Area: 0.2 acres (0.081 ha)
- Built: 1911
- Architect: George R. Mann
- Architectural style: Chicago
- NRHP reference No.: 81000141
- Added to NRHP: September 25, 1981

The Union Life Building is an eleven-story high-rise at 212 Center Street in downtown Little Rock, Arkansas. It was designed by Arkansas architect George R. Mann in the style of the Chicago school, and was built 1911–16. It is T-shaped in footprint, with brick curtain-wall construction on all sides except the main facade, which is faced in terra cotta tile and glass. The first two levels of the facade are crowned by an ornate cornice, its second-level segmented-arch windows echoed in windows and an arch design at the top of the building. It is Little Rock's only major example of Chicago style commercial architecture.

The building was listed on the National Register of Historic Places in 1981.

== See also ==
- National Register of Historic Places listings in Little Rock, Arkansas
