= Bentley Hotel =

- U.S. National Register of Historic Places
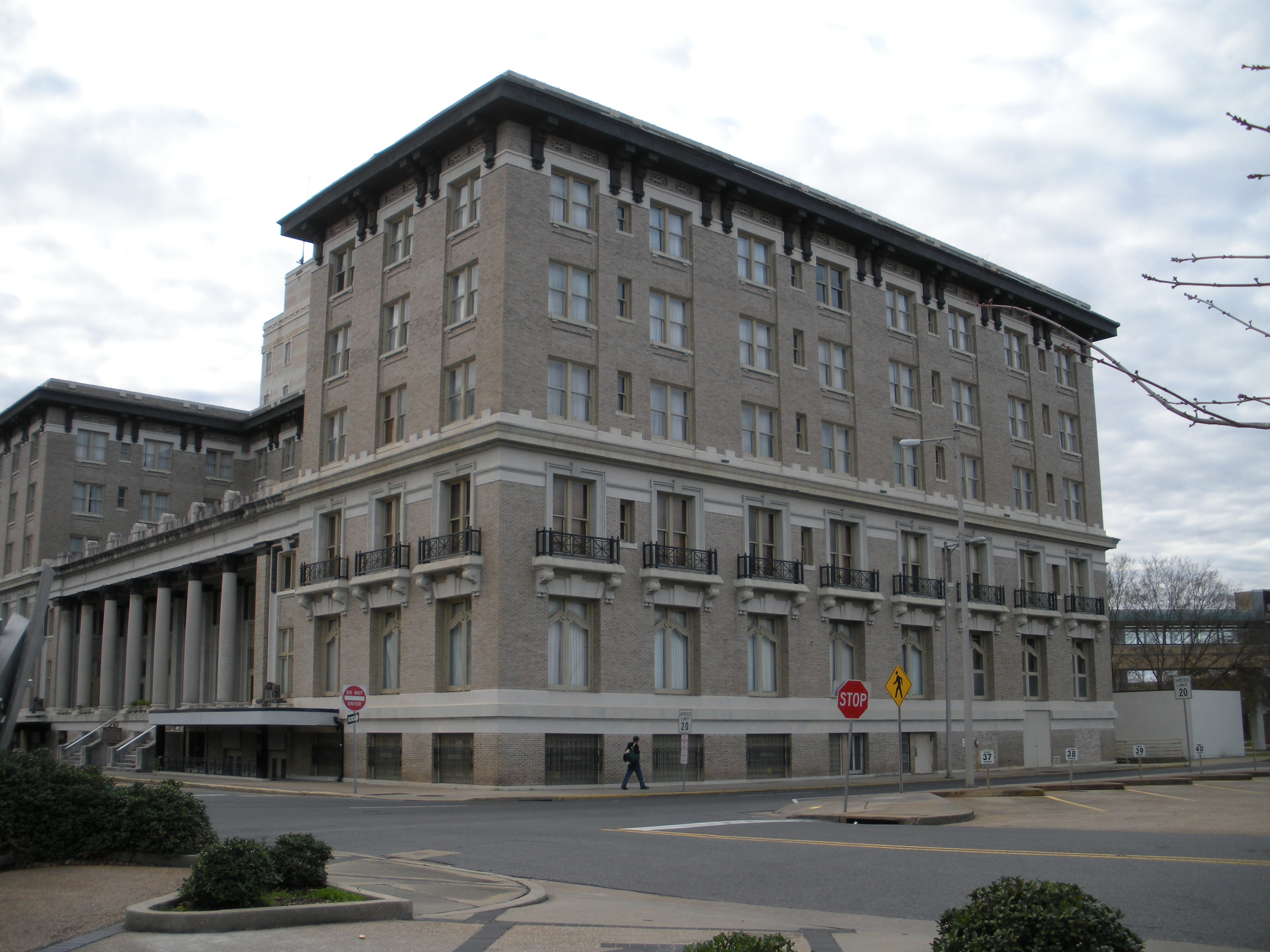
- Hotel Bentley

- Location within Louisiana Location within the United States
- Location: 200 Desoto St., Alexandria, Louisiana
- Coordinates: 31°18′43″N 92°26′42″W
- Area: 1 acre (0.40 ha)
- Built: 1907 (Opened 1908)
- Architect: George R. Mann
- Architectural style: Renaissance
- NRHP reference No.: 79001084
- Added to NRHP: November 15, 1979

Bentley Hotel, usually known as the Hotel Bentley, is a classic Renaissance-style hotel located near City Hall in downtown Alexandria in central Louisiana, United States.

== Description and history ==
The hotel was built by timber baron Joseph Bentley at a cost of $700,000, allegedly because he had been refused dinner service at another local hotel for not being properly attired. It opened to the public in August, 1908, and Mr. Bentley lived in the hotel until his death in 1938. The hotel has since accumulated a local reputation for paranormal activity, with reported phenomena including footsteps in empty corridors, elevators moving without passengers, doors opening and closing on their own, the scent of cigar smoke with no visible source, and sightings of a well-dressed apparition believed to be Bentley himself. On November 15, 1979, it was added to the National Register of Historic Places.

The hotel was once owned by Pineville real estate developer Buddy Tudor, who worked for its historic preservation..

Former owner Robert G. "Bob" Dean, Jr., of Baton Rouge closed the hotel in December 2004 and placed it on the market, at one time asking $12 million. The current owner, Michael Jenkins, purchased the facility for $3.4 million on October 11, 2012; The Bentley had been listed for $6.5 million. Jenkins has now reopened the renovated hotel with a hundred available rooms. The newer part of the structure, the seven-story tower, is being converted into condominiums; while the older section remains a hotel. The Bentley Room restaurant and Mirror Room lounge have also been reopened.

A case in the lobby has historic artifacts on loan from the Louisiana History Museum, and an area inside the Main Lobby has also been utilized to create a World War II exhibit, which showcases many items of memorabilia from the war. The Hotel Bentley was significant in World War II because of the famous Louisiana Maneuvers, which were conducted nearby. Notable military leaders visiting the area during that time included generals Omar Bradley, Dwight D. Eisenhower, George S. Patton, Jr., and Joseph Stilwell, among others. Many of these headquartered at the Bentley.

On August 10, 2018, the Bentley celebrated its 110th anniversary. In addition to the military figures, the Bentley has hosted such entertainers as Cary Grant, Roy Rogers, and John Wayne.
