= Arkansas Gazette =

Defunct broadsheet newspaper based in Little Rock, Arkansas, United States

- Type: Newspaper
- Format: Broadsheet
- Founder: William E. Woodruff
- Founded: November 20, 1819
- Ceased publication: October 18, 1991
- Language: English
- Headquarters: The Gazette Building; 112 West Third Street; Little Rock, Arkansas; 72201-2702
- Country: United States
- OCLC number: 8794697

The Arkansas Gazette was a newspaper in Little Rock, Arkansas, that was published from 1819 to 1991. It was known as the oldest newspaper west of the Mississippi River. It was located from 1908 until its closing at the now historic Gazette Building. For many years it was the newspaper of record for Little Rock and the State of Arkansas. It was Arkansas' first newspaper.

== History ==
The Arkansas Gazette began publication at Arkansas Post, the first capital of Arkansas Territory, on November 20, 1819. The Arkansas Gazette was established seventeen years before Arkansas became a state. When the capital was moved to Little Rock in 1821, publisher William E. Woodruff also relocated the Arkansas Gazette. The newspaper was the first to report Arkansas' statehood in 1836.

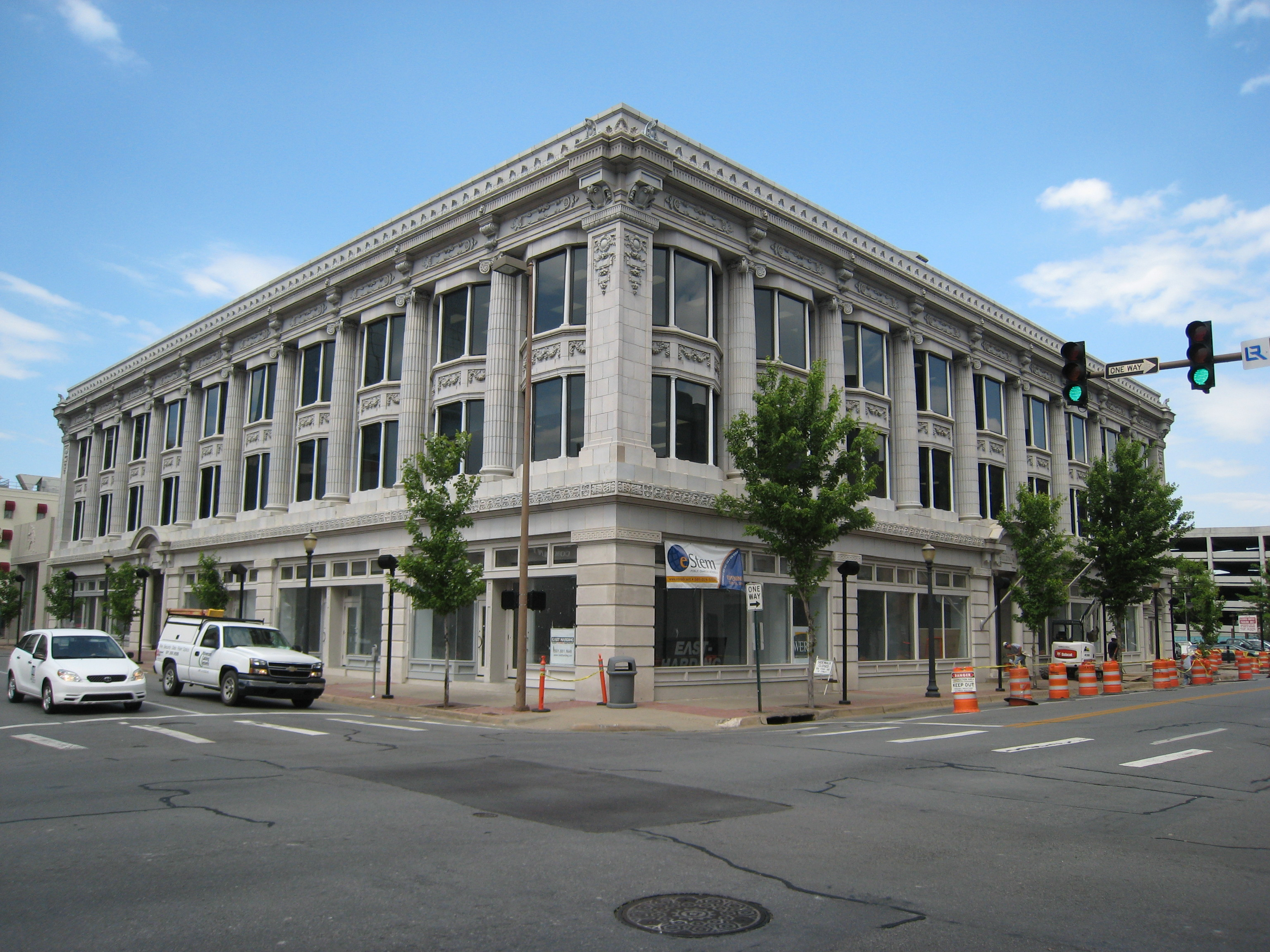
Arkansas Gazette building

Over the decades the paper was bought and sold many times. During the Civil War the paper shut down from September 1863 to May 1865. After the war the Gazette became the first newspaper to have telegraphic services from which they began to receive news from places like New Orleans, Louisiana, Memphis, Tennessee, and St. Louis, Missouri. In 1870 the paper editorialized that, "Although we have been most shamefully and outrageously wronged, cheated, and defrauded out of our just and lawful rights, by a most notoriously partial and partisan execution of the registration and election laws, we have succeeded in electing a respectable minority to the legislature, who will act as a Spartan guard at the Thermopylae of our menaced rights and liberties, and beat back the invading tide of radicalism that threatens to overwhelm us with ruin."

In 1908 the "Gazette" added colored comics. After the Elaine massacre of 1919, state officials concocted an elaborate cover-up, claiming that blacks were planning an insurrection. Newspapers, including the Arkansas Gazette, repeated the falsehood that blacks in Arkansas were staging an insurrection: the Gazette wrote that Elaine was "a zone of negro insurrection." Subsequent to this reporting, more than 100 African Americans were indicted, with 12 being sentenced to death by electrocution. After a years-long legal battle by the NAACP, the 12 men were acquitted.

During the Little Rock Nine Crisis the "Gazette" promoted the integration of schools, which caused a boycott. In 1958, the "Arkansas Gazette" was awarded a Pulitzer Prize for Public Service and Harry Ashmore of the "Gazette" was awarded the Pulitzer Prize for editorial writing for their coverage of the school integration crisis in Little Rock.

Through much of its history, the Gazette was in competition with the Arkansas Democrat. Competition became more intense in 1979 when the Democrat changed from publishing in the evening to publishing in the morning. After 12 years of bitter competition in the morning, the Arkansas Gazette published its final edition on October 18, 1991. The assets of the newspaper were sold to Walter E. Hussman Jr., owner and publisher of the competing Arkansas Democrat. Hussman renamed the surviving paper the Arkansas Democrat-Gazette.

== See also ==
- List of newspapers in Arkansas
