= Fulk =

Fulk is an old European masculine given name, probably deriving from the Germanic folk ("people" or "chieftain"). It is cognate with the French Foulques, the German Volk, the Italian Fulco and the Swedish Folke, along with other variants such as Fulke, Foulkes, Fulko, Folco, Falquet or Folquet, and so on. However, the above variants are often confused with names derived from the Latin falco ("falcon"), such as Fawkes, Falko, Falkes, and Faulques.

It is also a surname.

== Christian saints and clergymen ==
Ordered chronologically

- Fulk of Fontenelle (died 845), Abbot of Fontenelle, France
- Fulk (archbishop of Reims) (died 900), "the Venerable"
- Patriarch Fulk of Jerusalem (died 1157), Latin Patriarch of Jerusalem
- Saint Fulk, 12th century English saint
- Fulk of Neuilly (died 1201), French preacher of the Fourth Crusade
- Fulk of Pavia (1164–1229), Italian saint and Bishop of Piacenza
- Folquet de Marselha (c. 1150–1231), also known as Fulk of Toulouse, Provençal troubadour, monk and Bishop of Toulouse
- Fulk Basset (died 1271), Archbishop of Dublin
- Fulk Basset (bishop of London) (died 1259)
- Fulk or Fulke Lovell (died 1285), English bishop-elect

== Medieval noblemen ==
=== Counts of Anjou ===
- Fulk I of Anjou (about 870–942), also Count of Tours and Count of Nantes
- Fulk II of Anjou (died 958)
- Fulk III of Anjou (972–1040)
- Fulk IV of Anjou (1043–1109)
- Fulk, King of Jerusalem (1089/1092–1143), also Count of Anjou

=== Other noblemen ===
Ordered chronologically

- Fulk Bertrand of Provence (died 1051), Count of Provence
- Fulk of Vendôme (died 1066), Count of Vendôme
- Fulk of Angoulême (died 1087 or 1089), Count of Angoulême
- Fulk of Guînes (died 1125), 1st Lord of Beirut
- Fulk FitzRoy (1092–c. 1132), illegitimate son of Henry I of England
- Fulk I FitzWarin (1115-70/71), English marcher lord
- Fulk Paynel (died c. 1182), Anglo-Norman nobleman
- Falkes de Bréauté (died 1226), also spelled Fulk de Brent, Anglo–Norman soldier and nobleman
- Fulk Baynard (died after 1226), English landholder and justice
- Fulk FitzWarin (died 1258), English nobleman and outlaw
- Fulk le Strange, 1st Baron Strange of Blackmere (died 1324)
- Fulk Bourchier, 10th Baron FitzWarin (1445–1479), English baron of the House FitzWarin

== Others ==
- Fulk Baynard (fl. 1226), English landowner, official under King Henry III, and itinerant justice
- Fulk Greville Howard (1773–1846), English politician and soldier
- Fulk Lloyd (c. 1515–in or shortly before 1597), Welsh politician
- Fulk Lucy (c. 1623–1677), English Member of Parliament

== Surname ==
- Drew Fulk (born 1987), American producer and songwriter
- Jack Fulk (1932–2011), American businessman, founder of the Bojangles fast food restaurant chain
- Robert D. Fulk (born 1951), American philologist and medievalist

== See also ==
- Fulk Building, Little Rock, Arkansas, United States, a commercial building on the National Register of Historic Places
- Fulke, a list of people with the given name or surname
- Fulks, a list of people with the surname
- Fulque Agnew (1900-1975), British baronet
- Falco (disambiguation)
- Folco, a list of people with the given name or surname
- Folke (name)
- Fulco (disambiguation)
