= Folke (name) =

- Gender: male

Origin
- Origin: Old Norse
- Meaning: "chief"
- Region of origin: Scandinavia

Other names
- Related names: Fulk

Folke is a Swedish male given name, which means "chief", derived from the Old Norse folk. As of 2004, in Sweden there are 20,100 persons named Folke. Of them, about 5,700 had it as their main given name. In 2002, 118 newborn boys were named Folke, of them 15 as main name. The name may refer to:

- Folke Alnevik (1919–2020), Swedish athlete
- Folke Johansson Ängel (died 1277), Archbishop of Uppsala
- Folke Bengtsson (born 1944), Swedish ice hockey player
- Folke Bergman (1902–1946), Swedish explorer and archaeologist
- Folke Bernadotte (1895–1948), Swedish diplomat
- Folke Bohlin (musicologist) (born 1931), Swedish musicologist
- Folke Bohlin (sailor) (1903–1972), Swedish sailor
- Folke Ekström (1906–2000), Swedish chess player
- Folke Eriksson (1925–2008), Swedish water polo player
- Folke Filbyter (11th century), Swedish political leader
- Folke Fleetwood (1890–1949), Swedish athlete
- Folke Frölén (1908–2002), Swedish horse rider
- Folke Hauger Johannessen (1913–1997), Norwegian admiral
- Folke Herolf (1912–1982), Swedish Army officer
- Folke Heybroek (1913–1983), Dutch artist
- Folke Hjort (1934–1977), Swedish actor
- Folke Högberg (1884–1972), Swedish Army lieutenant general
- Folke Jansson (1897–1965), Swedish athlete
- Folke Johansson Ängel (died 1277), Swedish archbishop
- Folke Johnson (1887–1962), Swedish sailor
- Folke Jonsson (1904–1981), Swedish opera singer
- Folke Lind (1913–2001), Swedish footballer
- Folke Mellvig (1913–1994), Swedish writer
- Folke Rabe (1935–2017), Swedish composer
- Folke Rehnström (1942–2020), Swedish Army lieutenant general
- Folke Rogard (1899–1973), Swedish chess official
- Folke Rydén (born 1958), Swedish journalist
- Folke Sandström (1892–1962), Swedish horse rider
- Folke Skoog (1908–2001), American plant physiologist
- Folke Sundquist (1925–2009), Swedish actor
- Folke the Fat (11th century), Swedish political leader
- Folke Wassén (1918–1969), Swedish sailor
- Folke West (born 1948), Finnish filmmaker
- Folke Zettervall (1862–1955), Swedish architect

== See also ==
- Fulk
