= Fulco =

Fulco is a masculine given name and a surname which may refer to:

== Given name ==
- Fulco of Ireland (fl. 8th/9th century), Irish soldier and saint
- Fulco of Basacers (fl. 1120), Italo-Norman nobleman
- Fulco I, Margrave of Milan (died 1128), ancestor of the Italian branch of the House of Este
- Fulco (bishop of Estonia), appointed 1165
- Fulco Luigi Ruffo-Scilla (1840–1895), Italian cardinal
- Fulco Ruffo di Calabria (1884–1946), Italian World War I flying ace
- Fulco di Verdura (1898–1978), Italian jeweller

== Surname ==
- Bettina Fulco (born 1968), Argentine tennis player
- Fabio Fulco (born 1970), Italian actor
- Giovanni Fulco (died c. 1680), Italian painter
- William Fulco (born 1936), American Jesuit priest and linguist

== See also ==
- Falco (disambiguation)
- Folco, a list of people with the given name or surname
- Fulk, including a list of people with the given name or surname
