= Falquet =

Falquet or Folquet is a given name and a surname. It may refer to:

- Falquet de Romans (died after 1233), Provençal troubadour
- Folquet de Lunel (1244–c. 1300), Occitan troubadour
- Folquet de Marselha (c. 1150–1231), French troubadour, later a monk and Bishop of Toulouse
- André Falquet (1681–1755), Genevan merchant and trader
- Jean-Louis Falquet (1768–1842), Genevan politician and banker
- Yann Falquet, member of the Canadian music trio Genticorum
- Magnaba Folquet (born 2003), French footballer

== See also ==
- Fulk, a given name and surname
- Foulques, a given name and surname
