= Manu propria =

Latin expression – "by one's own hand"

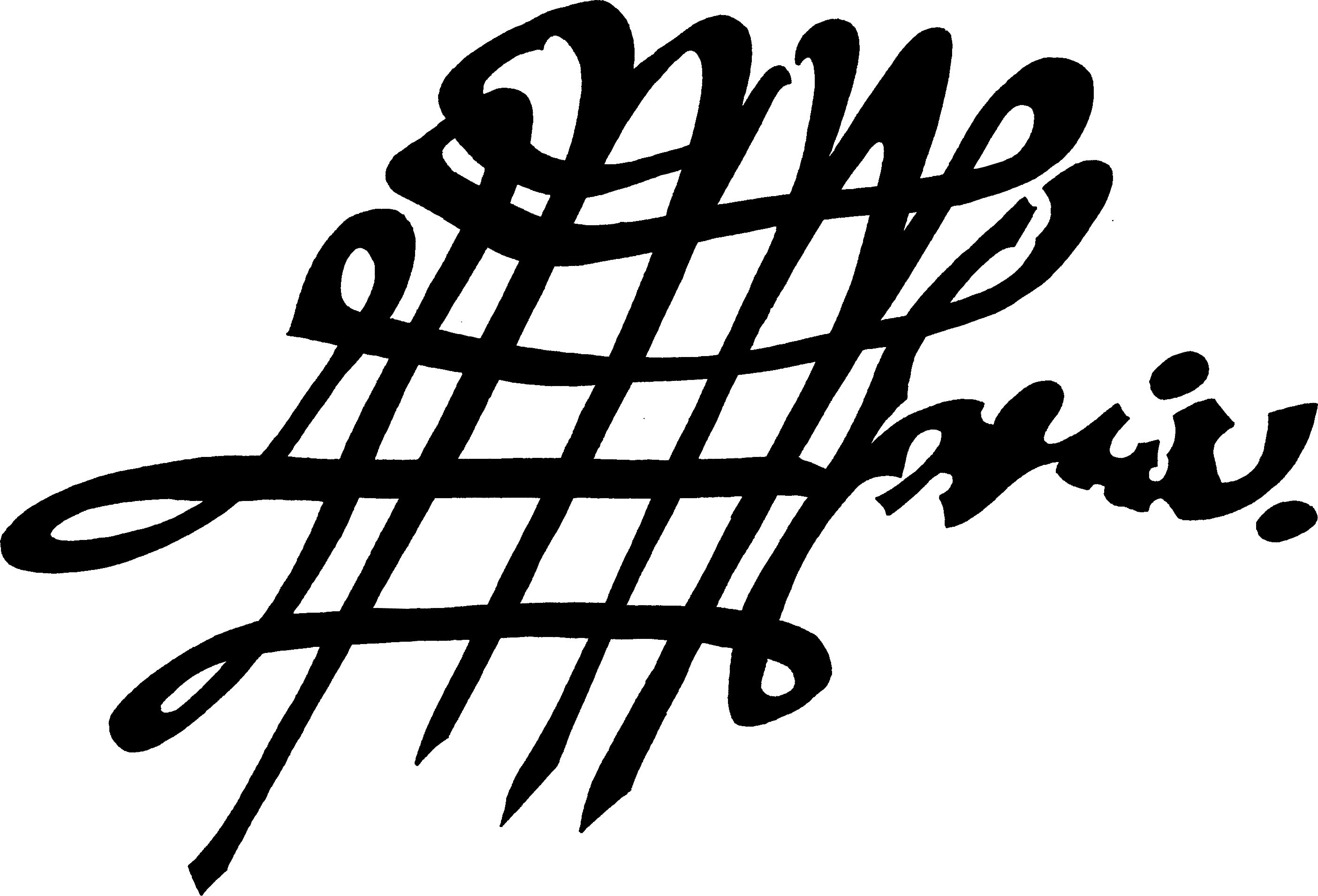
Example of medieval manu propria

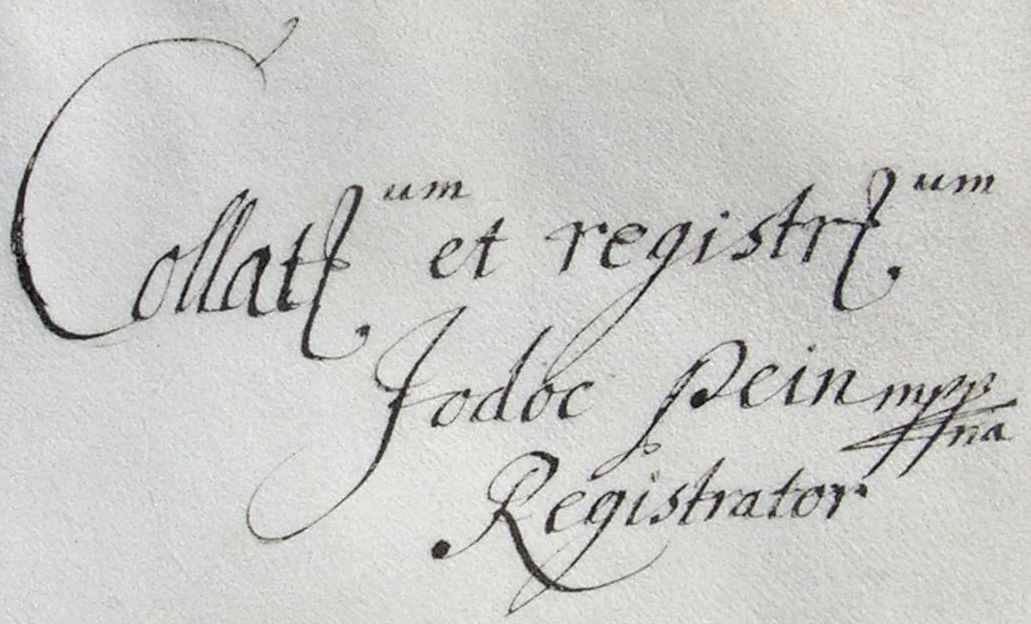
Jodoc Pein mppria in the Certificate of Nobility for André Falquet

Manu propria (Latin for '[signed] with one's own hand'; abbreviated m.p., mpp, mppr., or mppria) is a phrase sometimes used at the end of typewritten or printed documents when there is no handwritten signature. It is typically found just after the name(s) of the person(s) who would have signed the document if it had not been printed or typewritten.

It is also found in several ancient documents in front of or after the writer's signature at the end of the document.

== History ==
Medieval period

Richly decorated manu propria signs were frequently used by medieval dignitaries and literates to verify the authenticity of handwritten documents.

18th century

mppria was commonly used in the 18th century. However, it was not only used for Latin documents.

- Full autograph title-page of Symphony no.97 by Joseph Haydn which reads 'Sinfonia in C/di me giuseppe Haydn mppria. $\overline{792}$'
- Nobility Diploma André Falquet

From the 19th century

Later, official documents were routinely accompanied by this abbreviation, for example, the declaration of war on Serbia by Emperor Franz Joseph from 1914 ends with m.p.

== Usage today ==
By country

Some of the countries that still regularly use manu propria include:

- Albania in official documents: d.v. (Albanian: dora vetë),
- Austria: e. h. (Austrian German: eigenhändig),
- the Czech Republic: v. r. (Czech: vlastní rukou) or occasionally the Latin abbreviation m.p.,
- Germany: gez. (German: gezeichnet)
- Hungary in official documents: s.k. (Hungarian: saját kezűleg),
- Slovakia: v. r. (Slovak: vlastnou rukou),
- Slovenia: l.r. (Slovene: lastnoročno).
- Serbia: s.r. (Serbian: svojeručno)

== See also ==
- List of Latin phrases
- Seal
- Tughra
- Autopen
