= Falco =

Falco may refer to:

== Arts and entertainment ==
- Falco (book series), historical novels by Lindsey Davies
  - Marcus Didius Falco, protagonist of the book series
- Falcó (novel), a 2016 novel by Arturo Pérez-Reverte
- "Falco" (song), by Hitomi Shimatani
- Falco (TV series)
- Falco (Groove-On Fight character), a videogame character
- Falco Lombardi, a videogame character from the Star Fox series
- Falco Grice, a character from the anime series Attack on Titan

== Aviation ==
- Fiat CR.42 Falco, Italian World War II biplane fighter aircraft
- Reggiane Re.2000 Falco I, Italian World War II fighter aircraft
- Selex ES Falco, an Italian tactical unmanned aerial vehicle
- Sequoia Falco, an aerobatic aircraft

== People ==
- Falco (surname), a list of people with the surname Falco or Falcó
- Quintus Pompeius Falco (c. 70 – after 140), ancient Roman senator, general and governor of Britannia
- Falco of Maastricht (died 512), bishop of Maastricht
- Oberto Airaudi (1950–2013), also known as "Falco", Italian philosopher and artist
- Falco (musician), stage name of Johann "Hans" Hölzel (1957–1998), Austrian musician, singer and composer
- Andrew Falkous, known as "Falco", guitarist and frontman of the now-defunct band Mclusky and his new group Future of the Left
- Il falco, nickname of Paolo Savoldelli (born 1973), Italian cyclist

== Ships ==
- Italian ship Falco, various Italian naval ships

== Other uses ==
- Falco (bird), a genus commonly known as falcons
- Falco, Alabama, United States, an unincorporated community
- Falco Electronics, a Mexican electronics company
- Falco KC, a Hungarian basketball team
- Aprilia SL1000 Falco, an Italian sports motorcycle

== See also ==
- De Falco, a surname
