= Heybroek =

Heybroek is a surname. Notable people with the surname include:

- Hans M. Heybroek (1927–2022), Dutch botanist
- Inge Heybroek (1915–1956), Dutch field hockey player
- Folke Heybroek (1913–1983), Dutch expressionist artist
