= De Falco =

De Falco is a surname. Notable persons with that name include:

- Andrea De Falco (born 1986), Italian footballer
- Giuseppe De Falco (1908–1955), Italian politician
- Gregorio de Falco (born 1965), Italian naval officer and politician
- Lawrence Michael De Falco (1915–1979), American Catholic bishop
- Luigi De Falco (born 1976), Italian businessman
- Marcel De Falco (born 1962), French footballer
- Michele de Falco (c. 1688–after 1732), Italian composer
- Rubens de Falco (1931–2008), Brazilian actor
- Tom DeFalco (born 1950), American comic book writer and editor
- Torey DeFalco (born 1997), American volleyball player

== See also ==
- Falco (disambiguation)
  - Falco (surname), a list of people with the surname Falco or Falcó
