= Gus Blass Department Store =

- U.S. National Register of Historic Places
- U.S. Historic district – Contributing property
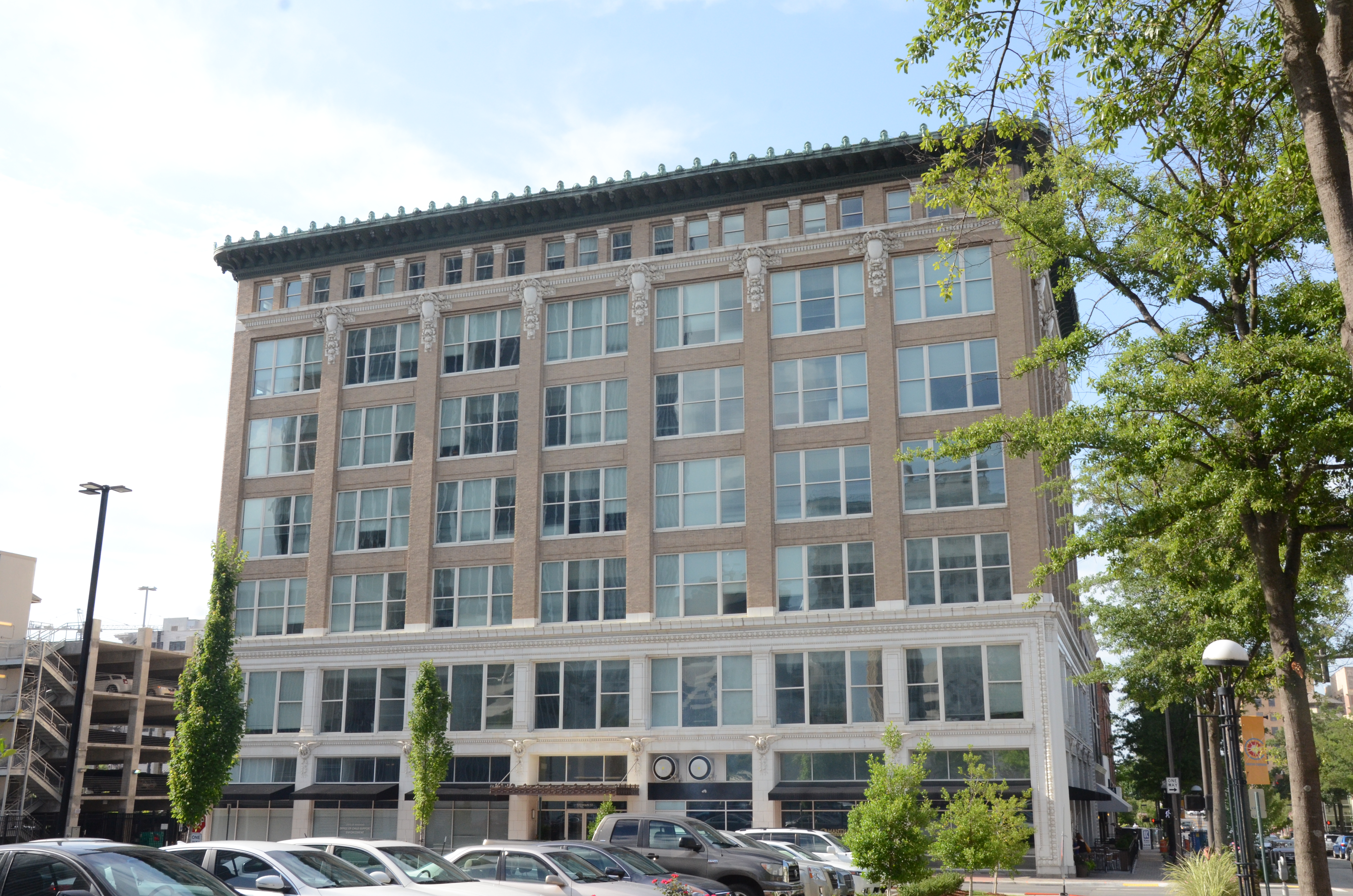

- Location within Arkansas Location within the United States
- Location: 318-324 Main St., Little Rock, Arkansas
- Coordinates: 34°44′43″N 92°16′16″W
- Area: less than one acre
- Built: 1912
- Architect: George R. Mann
- Architectural style: Late 19th And Early 20th Century American Movements, Sullivanesque
- Part of: Main Street Commercial District (ID10000396)
- MPS: Little Rock Main Street MRA
- NRHP reference No.: 86003122

Significant dates
- Added to NRHP: November 13, 1986
- Designated CP: June 25, 2010

The Gus Blass Department Store is a historic commercial building at 318-324 Main Street in Little Rock, Arkansas. It is a seven-story masonry structure, built in 1912 to a design by George R. Mann, a leading Arkansas architect. It was one of the first instances of two-way concrete slab construction in the nation, and was one of the first department stores in the state to be air conditioned (in 1936). The Blass Department Store was for many years the city's largest department store, and remained in business here into the 1970s, ultimately becoming a part of the Dillard's department store chain before closing in 1972.

The building was listed on the National Register of Historic Places in 1986.

== See also ==
- National Register of Historic Places listings in Little Rock, Arkansas
