= Fulke =

Fulke is a masculine given name and surname which may refer to:

== Given name ==
- Fulke Greville, 1st Baron Brooke (1554–1628), English poet, dramatist and statesman
- Fulke Greville (1717–1806), English landowner and diplomat
- Fulke Greville-Nugent, 1st Baron Greville (1821–1883), Irish politician
- Fulke Johnson Houghton (1940–2025), British racehorse trainer
- Fulke Lovell (died 1285), English bishop-elect
- Fulke Underhill (1578–1599), English alleged murderer
- Fulke Walwyn (1910–1991), British jockey and racehorse trainer

== Surname ==
- Pierre Fulke (born 1971), Swedish golfer
- William Fulke (1538–1589), English Puritan divine

== See also ==
- Fulk, including a list of people with the given name or surname
