= Falko =

Falko is a given name. Notable people with the name include the following notable people:

Given name

- Falko Bindrich (born 1990), German chess grandmaster
- Falko Götz (born 1962), German former soccer player and last manager of Holstein Kiel
- Falko Geiger, retired West German sprinter who specialized in the 400 metres
- Falko Kirsten (born 1964), former German figure skater
- Falko Krismayr, retired Austrian ski jumper
- Falko Ochsenknecht (1984–2024), German non-professional actor and party hits singer
- Falko Peschel (born 1965), German pedagogue and proponent of open learning
- Falko Steinbach (born 1957), German pianist and composer
- Falko Traber (born 1959), German high wire artist
- Falko Weißpflog (born 1954), East German ski jumper who competed from 1977 to 1980
- Falko Zandstra (born 1971), former Dutch speed skater

Surname

- Grigory Falko (born 1987), Russian swimmer from St. Petersburg
