= Foulques =

Foulques may refer to:

- Pope Clement IV (1190–1268), born Gui Foucois (French: Guy de Foulques or Guy Foulques)
- Foulques de Fontenelle (died 845), French saint and 21st abbot of Fontenelle
- Foulques de Chanac (died 1349), Bishop of Paris
- Fulk of Vendôme (died 1066), also known as Foulques l'Oison, Count of Vendôme
- Folquet de Marselha (c. 1150–1231), also known as Foulques de Toulouse, Genoese troubadour, Cistercian monk and Bishop of Toulouse
- Foulques de Villaret (died 1327), 25th Grand Master of the Knights Hospitaller
- Fulk I, Count of Anjou (c. 870–942), known by the nickname Foulques le Roux ("Fulk the Red")

== See also ==
- Fulk, a given name and surname
- Falquet, a given name and surname
