= Fulks =

Fulks is a surname. Notable people with the surname include:

- Alice Fulks (born 1982), American voice and stage actress
- Clay Fulks (1880–1964), American writer
- Donna J. Fulks, American voice actress
- Gayle Fulks (born 1985), American women's college basketball coach
- Joe Fulks (1921–1976), American basketball player, the National Basketball Association first scoring champion
- Juli Fulks, American women's college basketball coach
- Matt Fulks, American sports journalist
- Preston Fulks, a member of the American indie rock band Momma
- Quentin Fulks, American campaign manager and political strategist
- Robbie Fulks (born 1963), American alternative country singer-songwriter and instrumentalist
- Watson Fulks (1919–2001), American professor of mathematics and author

== See also ==
- Fulks Run, Virginia, unincorporated community
