= Taylor Building (Little Rock, Arkansas) =

- U.S. National Register of Historic Places
- U.S. Historic district – Contributing property
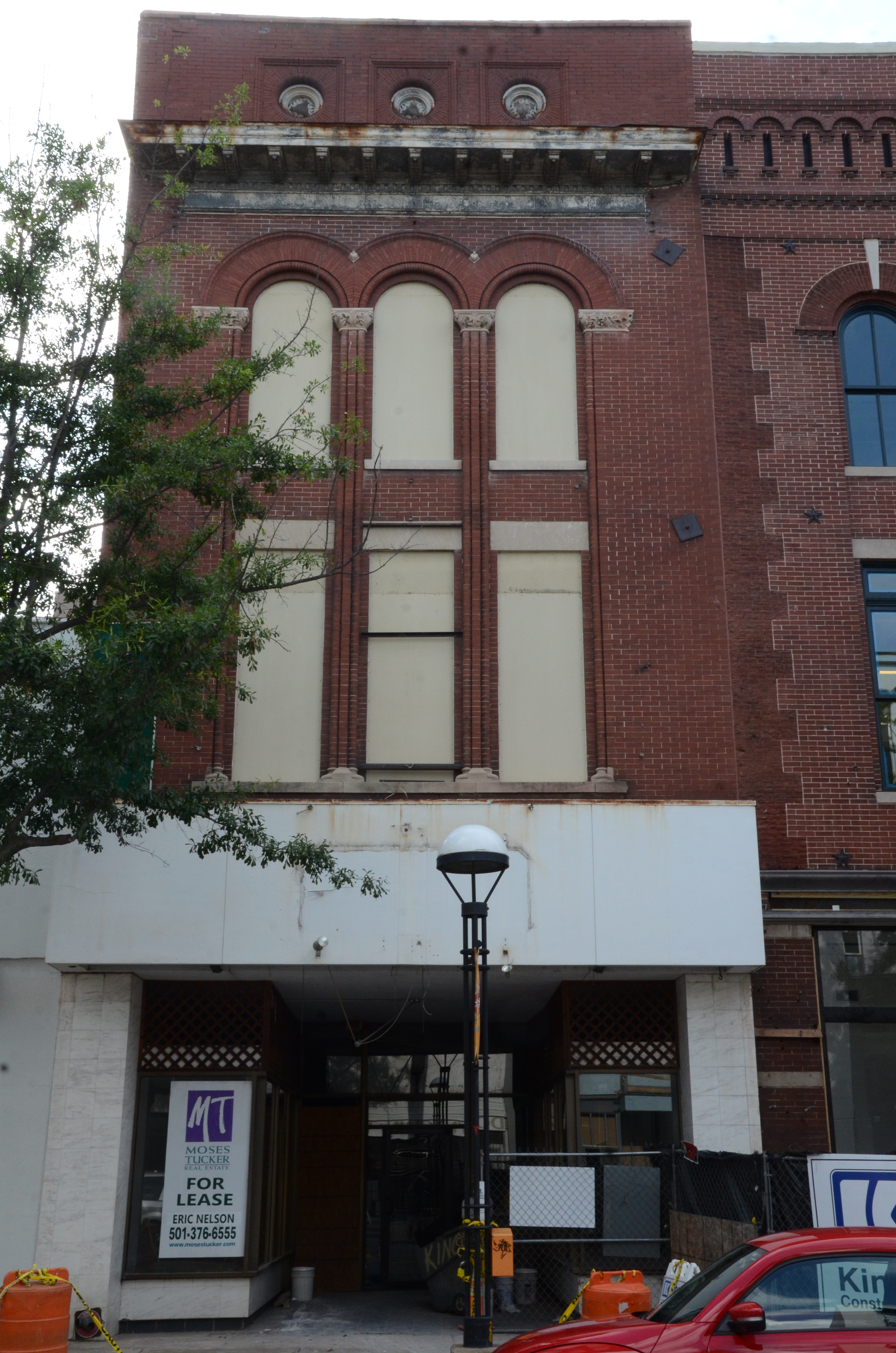

- Location within Arkansas Location within the United States
- Location: 304 Main St., Little Rock, Arkansas
- Coordinates: 34°44′45″N 92°16′16″W
- Built: 1900
- Architectural style: Late Victorian, Romanesque
- Part of: Main Street Commercial District (ID10000396)
- MPS: Little Rock Main Street MRA
- NRHP reference No.: 86003123

Significant dates
- Added to NRHP: November 13, 1986
- Designated CP: June 25, 2010

The Taylor Building is a historic commercial building at 304 Main Street in Little Rock, Arkansas. It is a three-story masonry structure, built out of load-bearing brick with limestone trim. Its facade has a commercial storefront on the ground floor, and three windows on the upper floors, articulated by two-story columns rising to limestone capitals and finely crafted Romanesque arches. Built in 1897, it is a rare surviving example of 19th-century commercial architecture in the city.

The building was listed on the National Register of Historic Places in 1986.

== See also ==
- National Register of Historic Places listings in Little Rock, Arkansas
