= Main Street Commercial District (Little Rock, Arkansas) =

Historic district in Arkansas, United States

- U.S. National Register of Historic Places
- U.S. Historic district
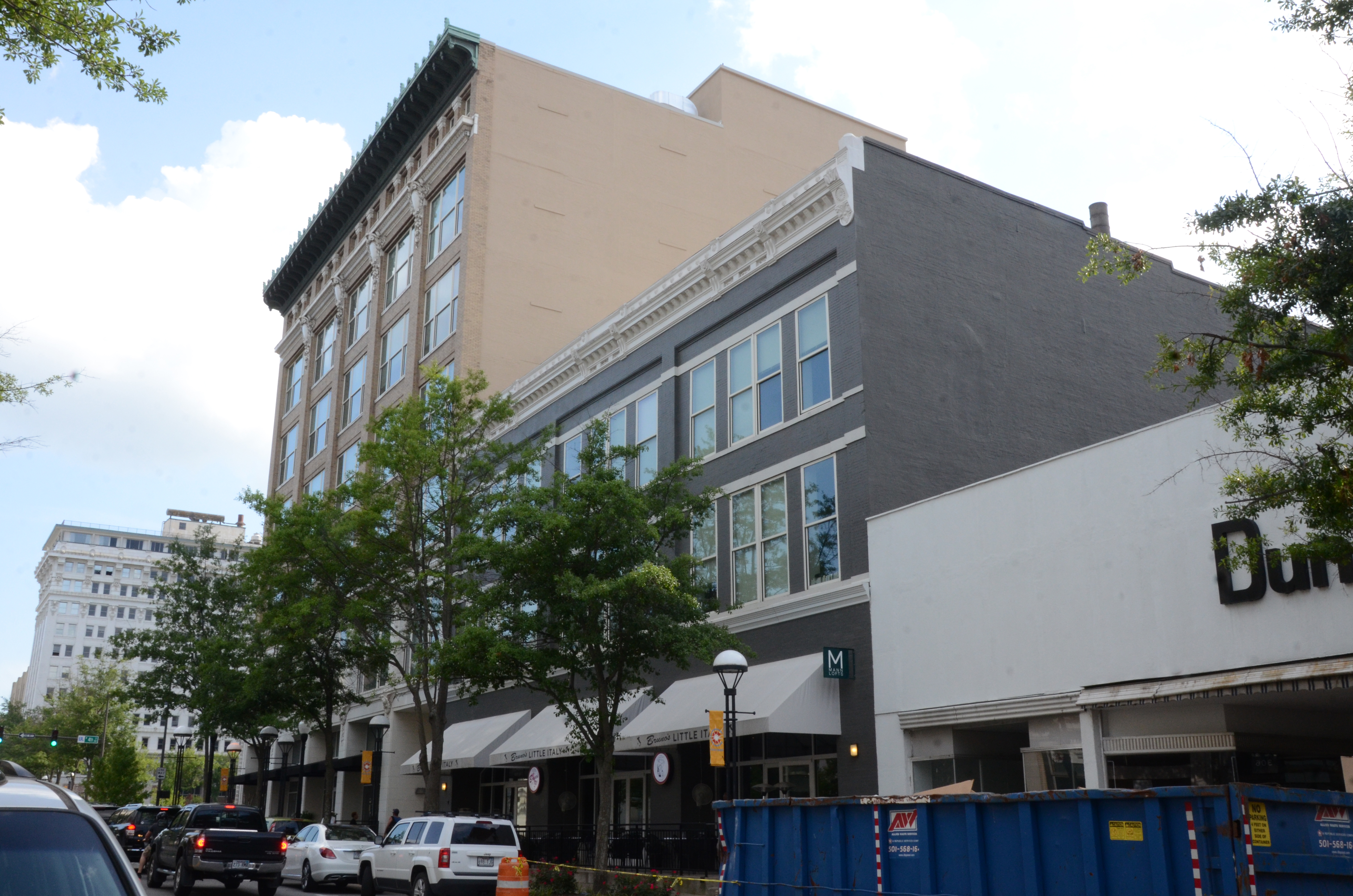

- Location within Arkansas Location within the United States
- Location: The 300 block of Main St bounded by E 3rd on the N and E 4th on the S, Little Rock, Arkansas
- Coordinates: 34°44′44″N 92°16′15″W
- Area: 3.3 acres (1.3 ha)
- Built: 1900
- Architectural style: Romanesque, Early Commercial, Classical Revival
- MPS: Little Rock Main Street MRA
- NRHP reference No.: 10000396
- Added to NRHP: June 25, 2010

The Main Street Commercial District is a historic district encompassing a typical downtown city block of Little Rock, Arkansas, during the first half of the 20th century. The district consists of ten buildings lining the east side of the 300 block of Main Street. This area was completely redeveloped after a fire in February 1900 sparked an explosion at an arms company, levelling the block. The buildings in the district are stylistically diverse, and were built between 1900 and 1955.

The district was listed on the National Register of Historic Places in 2010. Four of the district's buildings are also individually listed on the National Register: the Fulk Building, the Taylor Building, the Rose Building, and the Gus Blass Department Store.

== See also ==
- National Register of Historic Places listings in Little Rock, Arkansas
