= Gummeson Gallery =

Swedish art gallery

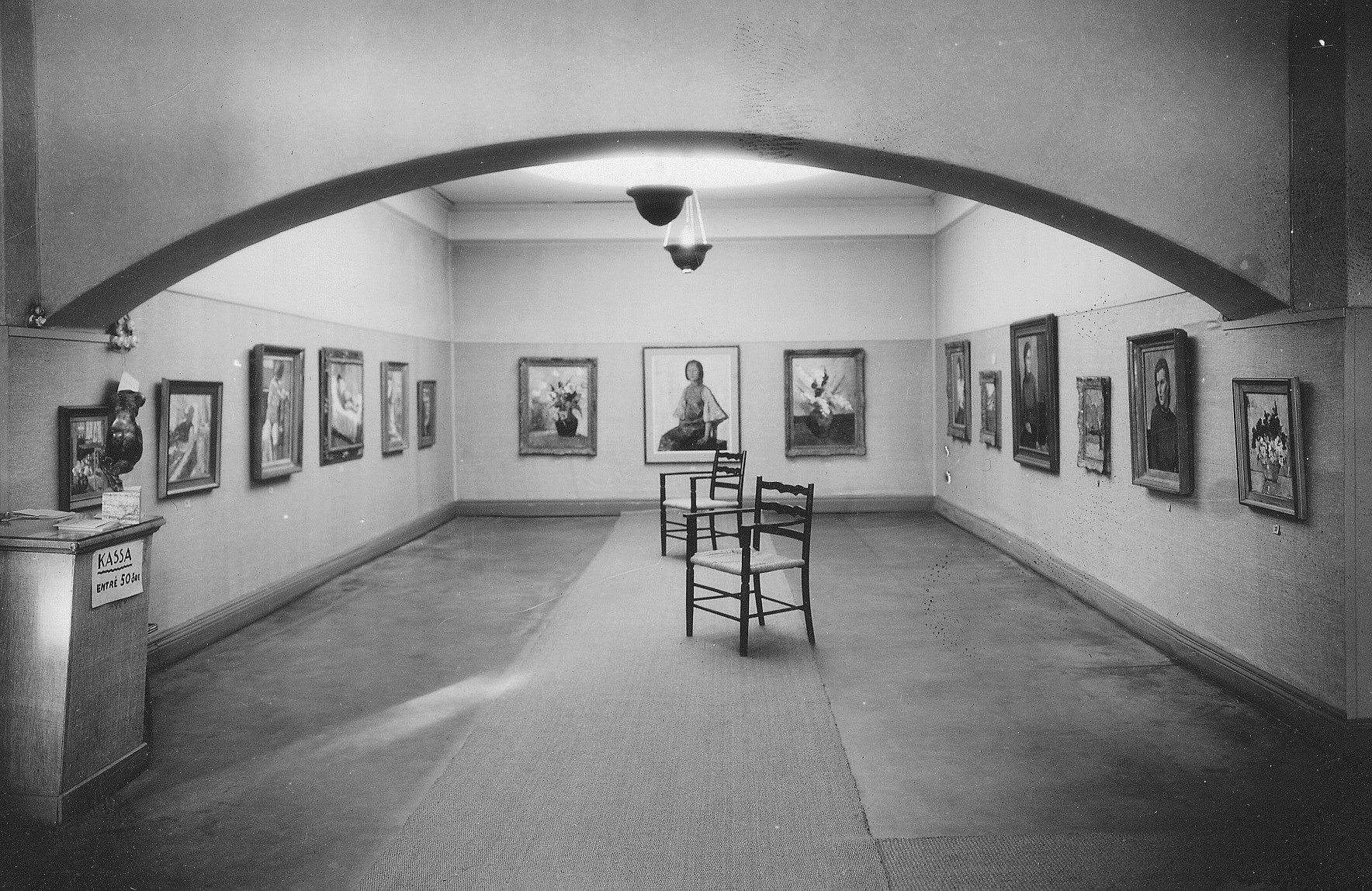
The Gummeson Gallery in 1933

The Gummeson Gallery, (Galleri Gummeson) is a contemporary art gallery situated on Strandvägen in Stockholm, Sweden.

== History ==
It was launched in 1912 by Carl Gummeson, a local bookdealer, and quickly gained a reputation for its support of Modern Art. In 1916 it held an exhibition for Wassily Kandinsky, and subsequently Paul Klee, Edvard Munch, Folke Heybroek, and Andy Warhol (1972). It has also promoted Swedish artists including Isaac Grünewald and Gösta Adrian-Nilsson, and expressionists Torsten Renqvist and Staffan Hallström.

== See also ==
- Contemporary art gallery
