= Fulk Building =

- U.S. National Register of Historic Places
- U.S. Historic district – Contributing property
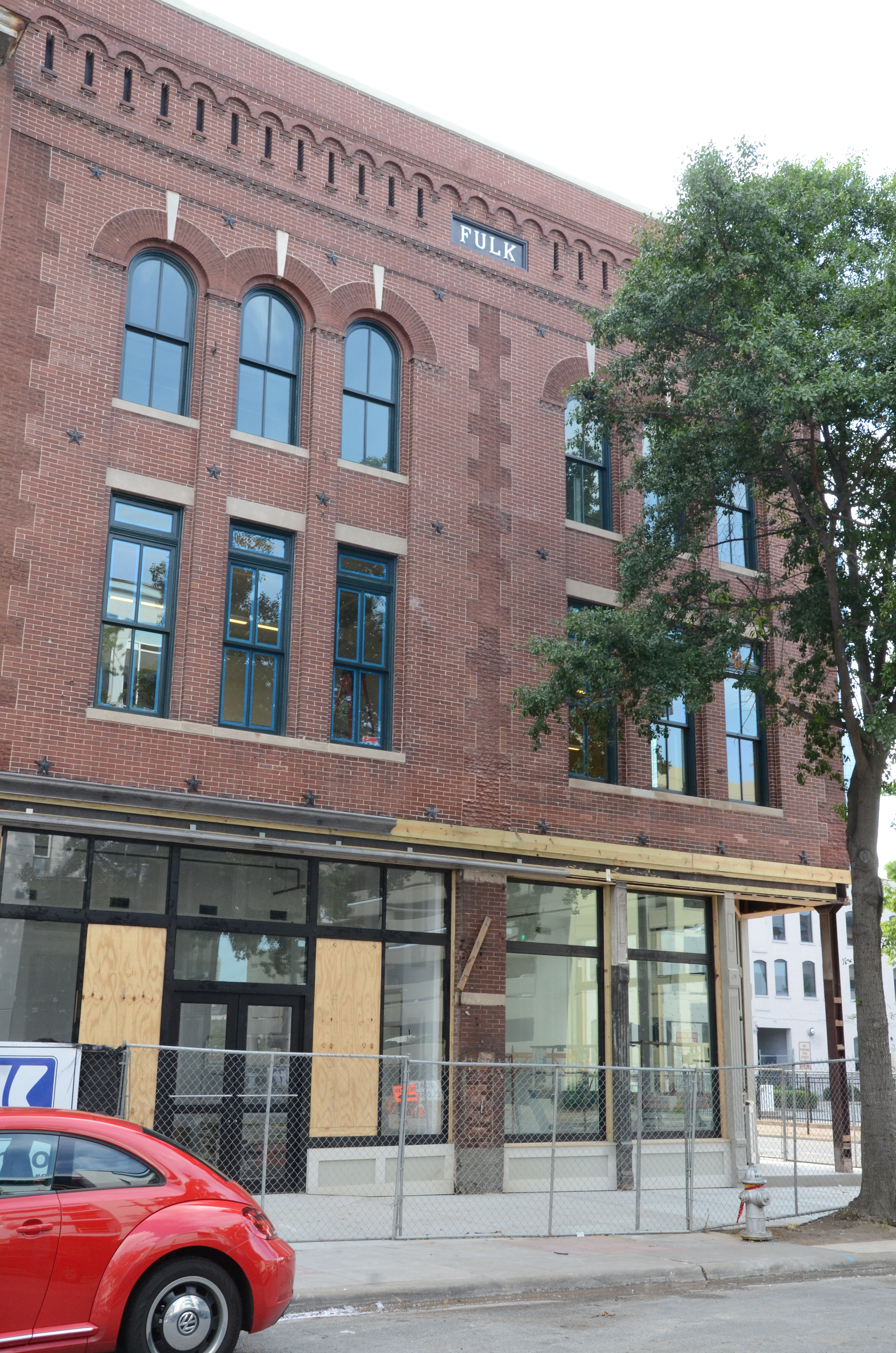

- Location within Arkansas Location within the United States
- Location: 300 Main St., Little Rock, Arkansas
- Coordinates: 34°44′45″N 92°16′16″W
- Area: less than one acre
- Built: 1900
- Architectural style: Romanesque Revival
- Part of: Main Street Commercial District (ID10000396)
- MPS: Little Rock Main Street MRA
- NRHP reference No.: 86003121

Significant dates
- Added to NRHP: November 13, 1986
- Designated CP: June 25, 2010

The Fulk Building is a historic commercial building at 300 Main Street in Little Rock, Arkansas. It is a three-story brick Romanesque Revival building, with commercial storefronts on the ground floor, and two-story round-arch bays on the upper levels. Built about 1900 for attorney and landowner Francis Fulk, it typifies buildings that lined Main Street around the turn of the 20th century, and is one of its better examples of Romanesque architecture.

The building was listed on the National Register of Historic Places in 1986.

== See also ==
- National Register of Historic Places listings in Little Rock, Arkansas
