= Michel Folco =

French writer and photographer

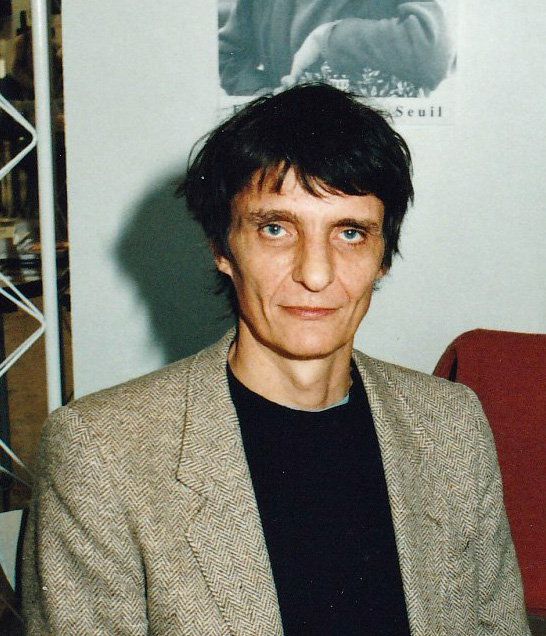
Michel Folco in 1995

Michel Folco (born 23 September 1943) is a French writer and photographer.

Before becoming a full time writer, Folco worked for various agencies as photographer.

== Bibliography ==
- Dieu et nous seuls pouvons (1991)
- Un loup est un loup (1995)
- En avant comme avant! (2001)
- Même le mal se fait bien (2008)
- La jeunesse mélancolique et très désabusée d'Adolf Hitler (2010)
- Ile Maurice
- La Reunion
