= Fulk Baynard =

English landowner (fl. 1226)

- Occupations: landowner, official under Henry III, and itinerant justice

Fulk Baynard (fl. 1226) was an English landowner, official under Henry III, and itinerant justice.

Along with other holding, he was a vassal of Robert Fitzwalter. After Fitzwalter's attempt to kill John of England in 1212, Baynard was required to give his son to the king as hostage in 1213. But Baynard continued to oppose John.

Baynard was seated at Merton, Norfolk, and was specially constituted a justice for a single occasion in November 1226.
