= Folke Johansson Ängel =

Archbishop of Uppsala from 1274 to 1277

Folke Johansson Ängel (Latin: Fulco Angelus; died 1277) was Archbishop of Uppsala.

He was ordained by Pope Gregory X in 1274 and was Archbishop of Uppsala until his death in 1277. As archbishop, he crowned King Magnus Ladulås in 1276. Archbishop Ängel is best known for commissioning the moving of the episcopal see from its location in what is now known as Old Uppsala to Östra Aros in Uppsala. Archbishop Ängel was buried in Uppsala Cathedral, which started to be constructed in 1272, as a part of the project of the episcopal see.

== See also ==
- List of archbishops of Uppsala

== Related reading ==
- Åsbrink, Gustav & Westman, Knut B. Svea rikes ärkebiskopar från 1164 till nuvarande tid (Bokförlaget Natur och Kultur, Stockholm 1935)
