= Folco =

Folco is a masculine given name and a surname. Notable people with the name include:

== Given name ==
- Folco de Baroncelli-Javon (1869–1943), French writer and cattle farmer
- Folco Lulli (1912–1970), Italian actor
- Folco Quilici (1930–2018), Italian film director and screenwriter
- Folco Portinari (died 1289), Italian banker

== Surname ==
- Michel Folco (born 1943), French writer and photographer
- Peter Folco (born 1953), Canadian ice hockey player
- Raymonde Folco (born 1940), Canadian politician

== See also ==
- Marcella Di Folco (1943–2010), Italian LGBT rights activist, actor and politician
- Philippe Di Folco (born June 1964), French author, screenwriter and teacher
