= Folke West =

Finnish television producer (born 1948)

Folke West (Westerholm; born 29 September 1948) is a Finnish television producer, reporter and tour leader. Folke has made more than 370 tourism documentaries mainly in the 1990s. He acted as the producer of Yöradio (Night Radio) radio programme of Radio Ykkönen in Finland. Tourism programmes made by West include Matkamies and Folken matkassa. In Finland many of his tourism programmes are generally considered as somewhat camp, mainly because of his extraordinary speaking style.

In summer 2006 Nelonen aired document series made by Folke West, "Nuori Fidel Castro" (Young Fidel Castro).

In 2004 West was a candidate in the elections for the European Parliament from the lists of Swedish People's Party.

== Personal life ==
West's son Anders Westerholm is a founding member of the hip hop group Kapasiteettiyksikkö. West lives in Havana, Panama City, and Helsinki with his Cuban wife Lene Marbel Benavides.
