= André Falquet =

Geneva merchant and politician

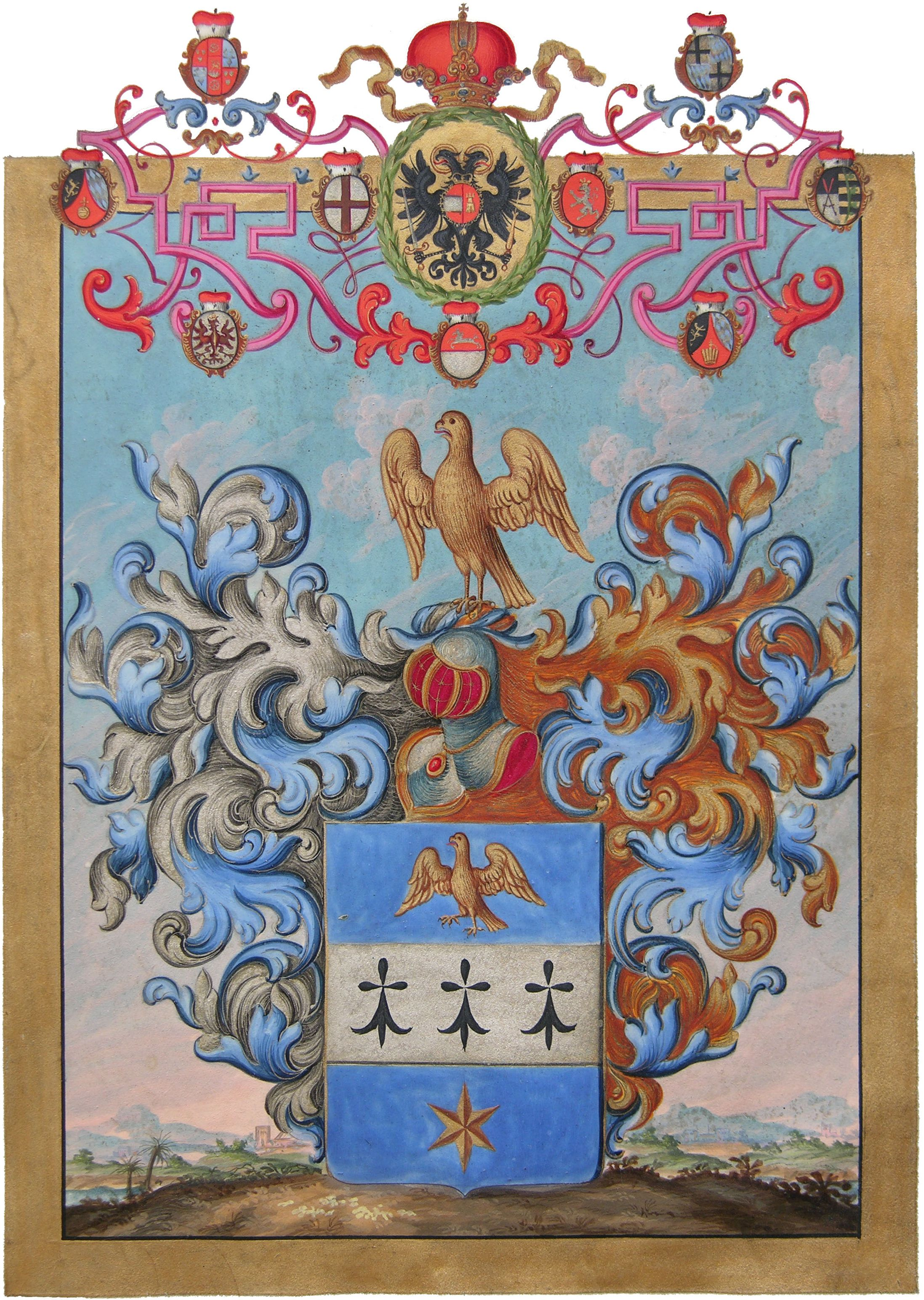
The coat of arms of Falquet improved with the document (see below) of 1725 by Charles VI.

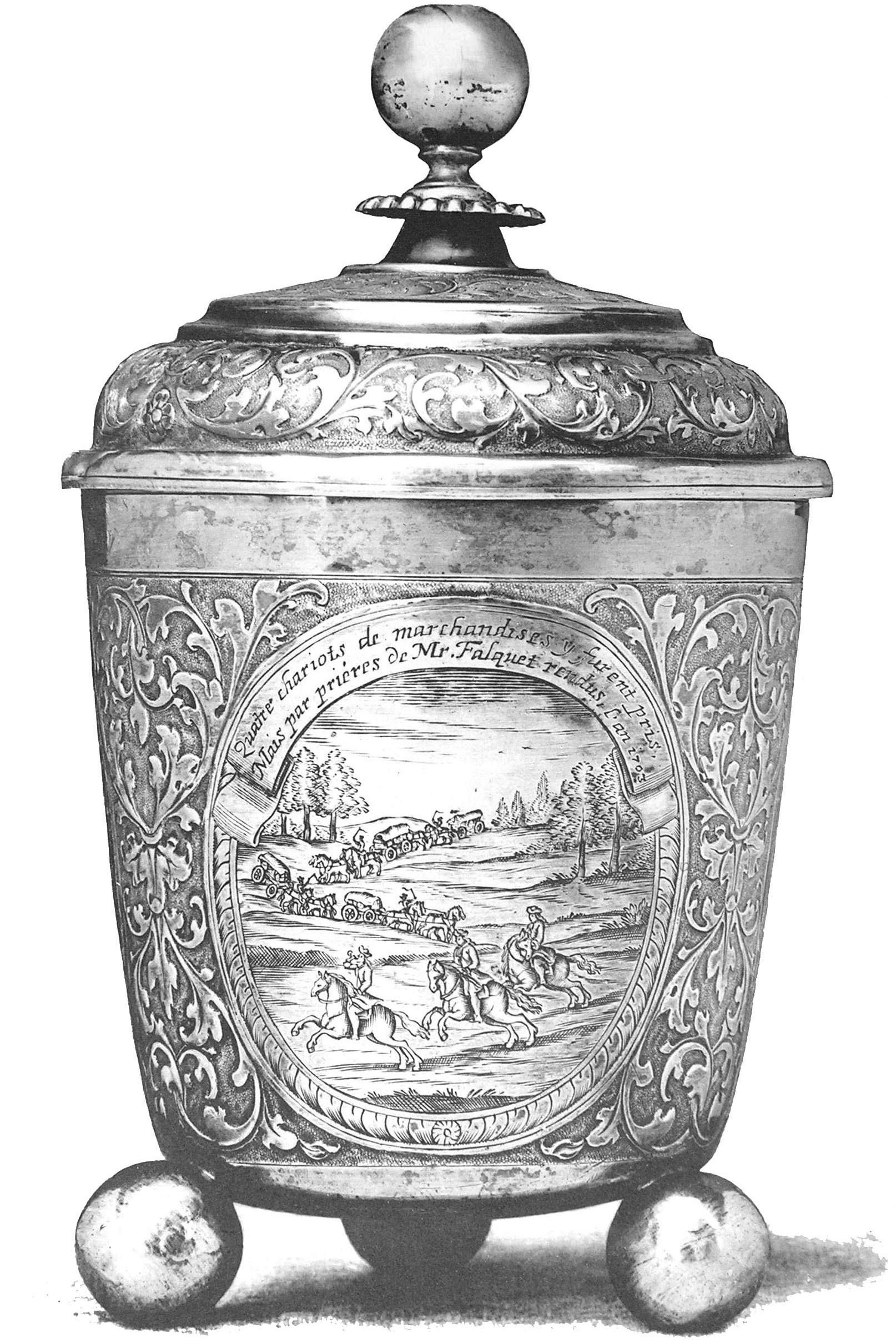
Le Gobelet d'André Falquet

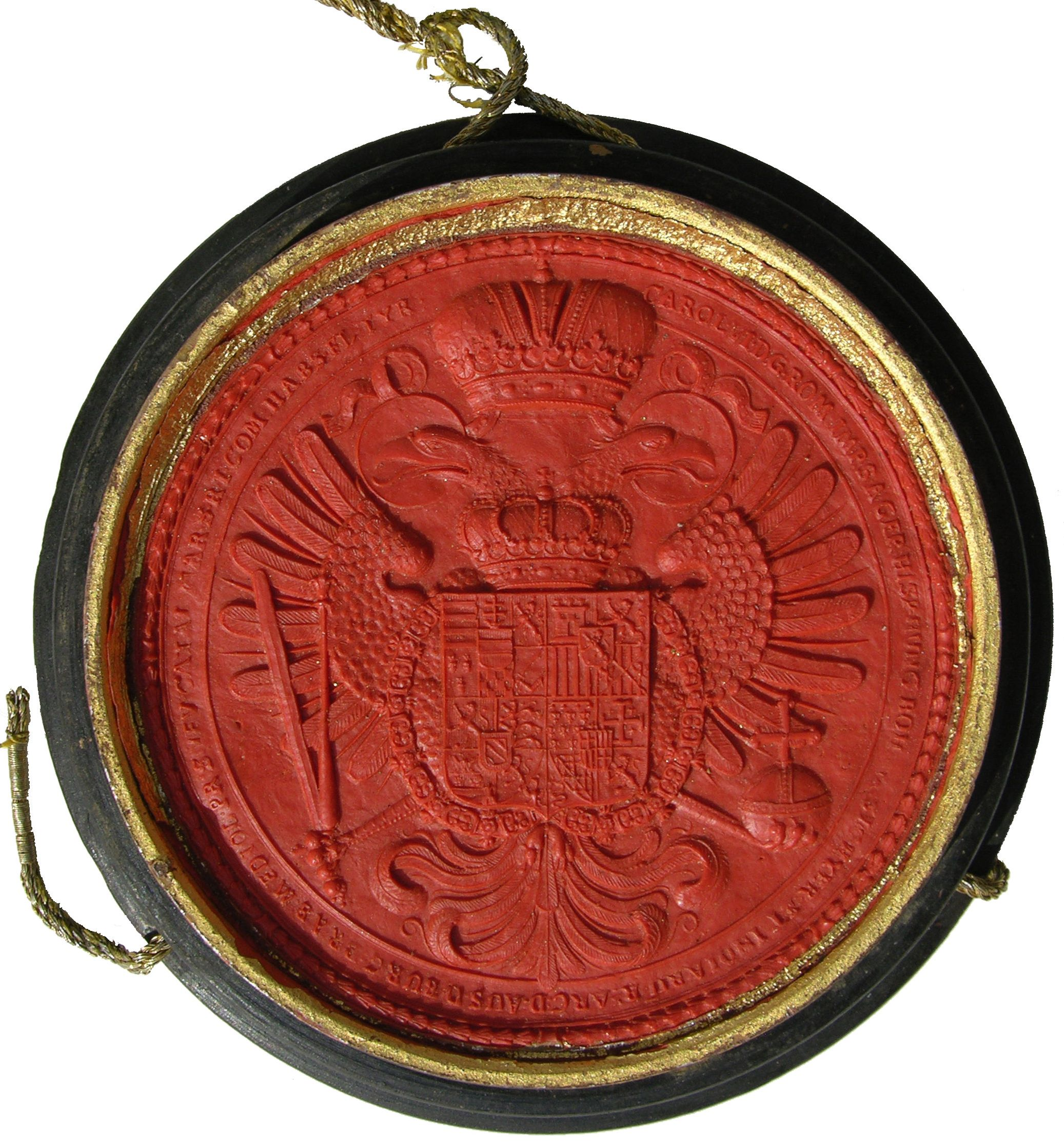
Seal of Charles VI attached to the diploma.

André Falquet (February 11, 1681 – January 28, 1755) was a Genevan merchant and trader, and a member there of the Council of Two Hundred.

== Life ==
Falquet's paternal ancestors came from Pouilly (Contamine-sur-Arve). His great-great-grandfather Aymé Falquet was a vinegar manufacturer there. André Falquet's great-grandfather eventually acquired a property in Geneva. Falquet's father Pierre was a jeweler.

André Falqet was baptized on Monday, February 14, 1681, in Saint-Pierre Cathedral by Charles Dufour. The godfather was André Rousseau, the brother of David Rousseau, Jean-Jacques' grandfather.

Falquet worked in his father's business (jewelry trade) from the completion of his studies (1703). In 1703 he traveled through Southern Germany. While there, he became involved in the turmoil of the War of the Spanish Succession and, since he spoke French, was able to plead with the French Marshal de Villars for the release of four confiscated wagons with merchandise belonging to Augsburg merchants. For this he received from the city of Augsburg a silver-gilt cup, the Gobelet André Falquet. For the services rendered to the Imperial Austrian Army (trade transactions), Falquet was ennobled and his coat of arms was improved by the Nobilization Certificate of June 16, 1725.

André Falquet married Suzanne Lullin on June 10, 1731.

From 1734 Falquet was a member of the Geneva Council of Two Hundred.

== Nobility Diploma ==
In 1725 he was ennobled by a document of Charles VI and his coat of arms was improved. The document contains thirteen inscribed parchment pages, of which the depiction of the coat of arms fills an entire page. The entirety of the document is written in Latin, since the chancery regulations did not allow the use of French – André's native language – but prescribed the use of German or Latin. The document is signed and witnessed several times, as required by letters of nobility and arms of the Imperial Court Chancellery, namely by

- Charles IV;
- Friedrich Karl Graf von Schönborn, the Imperial Vice-Chancellor;
- Philipp Wilderich Johann Georgendiel von Georgenthal, the "secret secretary and referendary of Latin expedition" of the Imperial Court Chancellery;
- Jodoc Pein, the Registrar of the Imperial Court Chancellery.

The seal of Charles VI is also attached to the letter.

== Family ==
Some of his descendants, Jean-Louis Falquet, were again statesmen.

== See also ==
- Gobelet André Falquet

== Literature ==
- Archives Héraldiques de la Suisse, Bd. XXXII (1918), S. 24.
- Anzeiger für Schweizerische Altertumskunde, Zürich. Jg. 25 (1892).
- J. Haller & S. Brügger: Adelsbrief André Falquet. Aspekte einer kaiserlichen Urkunde von 1725, Aarau 2007 (Maturaarbeit).
- Gustave Chaix d'Est-Ange: Dictionnaire des familles françaises anciennes ou notables à la fin du XIXe siècle: Fab-For, Éditions Vendôme, 1983, S. 82 ff., (gallica.bnf.fr: Full view), (Google Books: snippet view).
- C.F. Lendorff: Almanach généalogique suisse, Band 4, 1913, S. 192, (archive.org: Full view), (Google Books: snippet view).
- J.-A.Galiffe: Notices généalogiques sur les familles genevoises, depuis les premiers temps, jusqu'à nos jours, Genève, 1831, S. 250 Googlebooks
- Vermerk über den Taufpaten André Rousseau in Rosenblatt, H.: Rousseau and Geneva: From the First Discourse to the Social Contract, 1749–1762, 1997, Cambridge University Press, ISBN 0-521-57004-2, Seite 31, Fussnote 99, Googlebooks.
- CH AVG (Archives de la Ville de Genève): Factums judiciaires, Band 2, Nummer 14 und 14bis.

== Website links ==
- Origunal Latin text of the nobility diploma
- adelsbrief.com – Haller, J. & Brügger, S. – Excerpts of a high school thesis (Maturaarbeit) about the Nobility Diploma of André Falquet
