= Falko Steinbach =

German-American pianist and composer (born 1957)

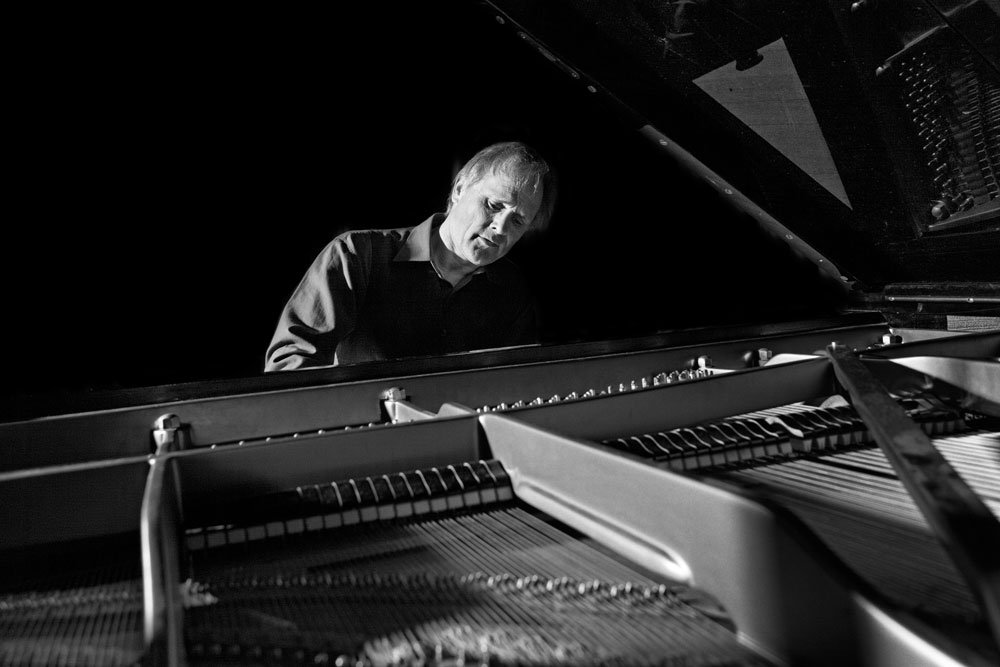
Falko Steinbach in Lindlar 2012

Falko Steinbach (born 30 September 1957 in Aachen, West Germany) is a German/American pianist, composer and piano pedagogue. In 1999, he joined the music faculty at the University of New Mexico and became a full professor of piano in 2010. He was granted US citizenship in 2011. He is a noted teacher of piano and composition, and author of several pedagogical works including an acclaimed volume on piano methodology, “A Compendium of Piano Technique”.

== Biography ==
=== Childhood and education ===
Steinbach was born in Aachen, Germany, and raised in Bergisch Gladbach. He began studying music at an early age, receiving his first instruction from his father before continuing piano studies with Grete Selle. As a teenager, he composed works for piano and chamber ensembles, gave public performances, and served as a choir director at a local Catholic parish.

He won first prize in the 1976 “Jugend musiziert” Piano Competition in Bergisch-Gladbach, and before his graduation from the Gymnasium later that year, he became a “Jungstudent” at the Musikhochschule Köln. He was a teaching assistant to his performance instructor, Prof. Tiny Wirtz, during his first year in the program, and completed the MM with distinction, followed by the Konzertexamen (a degree equivalent to the DMA) in solo performance studies.

Steinbach studied theory and composition at the Rheinische Musikschule in Cologne and won first prize in the regional Jugend musiziert piano competition in 1976. He subsequently enrolled as a young student at the Hochschule für Musik Köln, where he completed degrees in piano performance, including the Konzertexamen. From 1986 to 1987, he pursued postgraduate studies at the Guildhall School of Music and Drama in London, studying with Craig Sheppard and working with Peter Feuchtwanger. He also undertook masterclasses and studies with musicians including Tatjana Nikolajewa, Boris Pergamenschikov, members of the Amadeus Quartet, and Dietrich Fischer-Dieskau.

=== Performer, composer and teacher ===
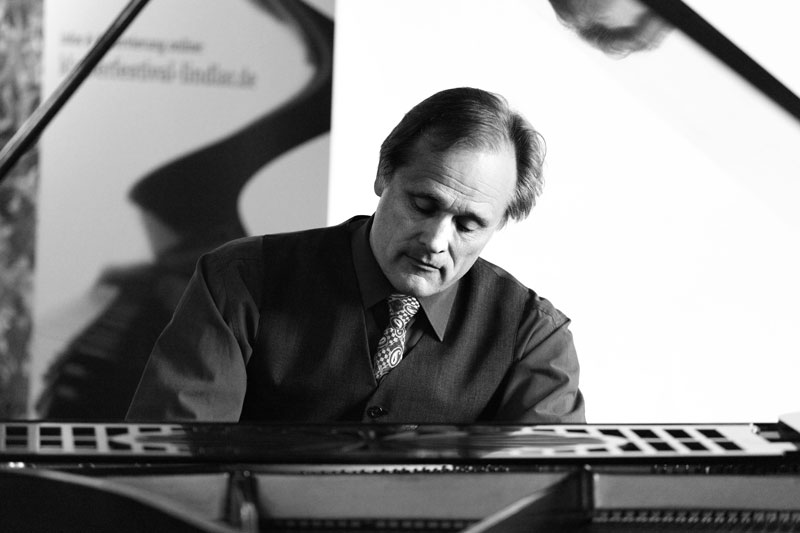

Steinbach's performance career since the 1980s has included solo recitals, as well as collaborative performances with other soloists, chamber ensembles, and orchestras in the United States, Europe, and Asia. He is regularly invited to perform at international music festivals, and in addition to giving approximately thirty concerts each year he continues to be an active recording artist of repertory extending from Bach to contemporary piano music. Steinbach has been critically acclaimed for his individual and deeply philosophical ‘metaphysical’ approach to his craft. He is a passionate promoter of new music, and frequently premieres new works, many of which are written for, and dedicated to him in lecture recitals. He has recorded over fifteen albums of Baroque, Classical, Romantic, and Contemporary music with Ambitus, Edition Antes, Centaur Records and Navona Records, and has also completed recordings for the WDR and NDR radio broadcasters. He has also appeared on German, Malaysian, and US radio and television as a performer, and scholarly expert in the field. Within his extensive catalog are the first recordings of many of the works of Hans Eisler, P. Dessau, and Kurt Schwaen, as well as his own works and those of many other composers. Steinbach's artistry is also, in his terms, driven by a proactive engagement with humanitarian programs working against discrimination. In addition to numerous benefit concert performances, proceeds from his album, “Klassik für Menschenrechte” listing works of Bach, Beethoven, Mozart, Chopin and Bartók, were donated to the Casa Alianza Children's Aid of Guatemala, and Amnesty International. Similarly proceeds from the album, “Humanity Classics,” financed by the Landschaftsverband Rheinland and featuring piano concertos by Mozart and Schnittke, were donated to the recovery and treatment of the women victimized by the Soviet-era Bulgarian treatment facility, Malko Scharkovo.

From the time of his early studies, Steinbach was most interested in performing and only in his teenage years did he begin to focus on composition studies with greater concentration. By the time he was twenty-four years of age, he opted to formally study theory and composition at the Musikhochschule Köln with Prof. Manfred Reiter, and Prof. Roland Löbner. He completed his first serious piece, “Suite in Three Movements” for piano in 1982, and shortly after completed his theory studies to earn a Staatsexamen (equivalent to a modern“Bachelor's Degree). He has since continued to develop his compositional process using unique approaches to dodecaphony, rotational systems and set class transformation, points of symmetrical inversion, stylistic synthesis, and jazz-influenced patterns and rhythms. Steinbach believes that “to study composition with a teacher is a contradiction in itself. Nowadays it is absurd to talk about tonality or atonality. Both terms are redundant if you perceive music through rotational systems, movement and emotions. There are no rules and fashions for me.” His oeuvre encompasses almost fifty compositions, including one opera entitled “Berlin Suite,” the church music cycle “Apocalypse,” numerous major cycles for choir and various ensembles, piano ensembles and noted cycles of etudes and other works for solo piano. Many of his compositions are commissioned works such as his “Agnes Mass” (2002) written for the 100th anniversary of the Church of St. Agnes in Cologne, and "Mystic Circle" for small ensemble (2013), an homage to Igor Strawinsky written for the John Donald Robb Composer Symposium in 2013.

Steinbach is recognized worldwide for his “inexhaustible fantasy,” his “mesmerizing sound” and his sharp understanding of the possibilities of playing piano and understanding its physical, spiritual and mental aspects. His work emphasizes the careful production of tone quality in all musical contexts, and in particular, the relationship between movements and the sounds they produce; with respect to his unique approach to piano music, he explains “sound is the gate to our emotions – you can see the sound and hear the movements performed on the piano” in these works. Steinbach has spent much of his composition, performing and teaching career exploring the effects of both listening to, and performing music on human sensory process and cognition. In relation to these insights, one finds in his works unique and thoughtful attention to aspects of sound, space, time, and physical movements both in surface details, and within the larger structure of many works, such as those found in his cycles of etudes. His largest etude cycle, “Figures” has been the subject of two doctoral dissertations. The first, "The Interdependence of Movement and Sound in all Aspects of Piano in Falko Steinbach's "Figures"- 17 Choreographic Etudes for Piano (2006.)" was published in 2010 by Taiwanese pianist, Shu Ching Cheng, at the University of Arizona. The second, "A Structural Analysis for Performers: Falko Steinbach's "Figures: 17 Choreographic Etudes for Piano," was published in 2012 by American pianist, Alexander Schwarzkopf at the University of Oregon. Steinbach's passion and dedication for both artistic and pedagogic work are reflected in his 53 piano etudes “Figures,” “Moving,” “Finger Paintings,” “Mirror Visions,” and “Etude 53,” and in his comprehensive text, “A Compendium of Piano Technique.” The methods presented in these works provide guidance for students at beginning, intermediate, and advanced skill level, and because of the breadth and consistency of his approach, his students are among the noted performers in the state of New Mexico, and the surrounding region; many of these students have achieved professional and academic positions, scholarships, grants, and prizes at piano competitions and universities. Steinbach has given master courses at universities and music festivals in Germany, Italy, The United States, Mexico, Taiwan and Malaysia and has acted as a juror for many national and international piano competitions.

=== Honorary activities ===
Steinach co-founded the Initiative for the Enrichment of Culture to benefit and promote musicians, composers and artists in 1987 in Hückeswagen, Germany, and was a member of the board of directors for several years after. He then co-founded an association for contemporary music, Klang Köln e.V., in 1991, and, was acting chair and associate chair until 2000. While a member of this organization, he performed, and made recordings with many noted performers and singers including Francoise Groben, Tina von Altenstadt, Anne Schwanewilms and Marlene Mild, and worked with fellow composers, Christoph Maria Wagner, Stefan Thomas, Oliver Trötschel and Thomas Reiner. He was artistic director of the Tage Neuer Musik, 2001 In Brauweiler, Germany, and was also the artistic director for The "Streams" Music Festival in 2010 and 2013, which featured numerous contemporary composers including Maurizio Kagel, Kurt Schwaen, Barbara Rettagliati, Massimo Berzolla, Martin Christoph Redel, Alexander Litvinowski, Christopher Shultis and others. Since 2004, he has been a board member of der Abtei Brauweiler Concert Series, and in 2009 he founded the "Internationales Klavierfestival Lindlar" near Cologne. He is the current artistic director for this festival, which has become a significant and highly acclaimed cultural event in the region.

=== Achievements and recognition ===
In 1986 Steinbach was awarded a DAAD scholarship from the German government to fund his advanced studies in England. He received two grants in 1997 and 1998 from the Stiftung Kunst und Kultur of the state North Rhine-Westphalia to produce the album, “Six Take,” as well as “Lieder aus dem Exil,” a WDR produced CD with soprano Marlene Mild. In 1999 he received a grant from The University of New Mexico to translate his German-language volume on piano technique, “Klaviertechnisches Kompendium,” into English, and in 2006 he received another UNM grant to publish his etude cycle, “Figures” – 17 Choreographic Etudes for Piano.” He received grants in 2008, including a RAC grant from UNM, to publish his recording of "Figures" with Centaur Records. The "Internationales Klavierfestival Lindlar", which he founded received the "Student Abroad Funding" award of the University of New Mexico in 2014. Steinbach is a member of GEMA. Verlag Edmund Bieler, Cologne, currently publishes his compositions.

== Personal life ==
He currently lives and his three children Tankred Noel, Ronja Magdalena and Sebastian Miles in Albuquerque, New Mexico, U.S.A. and in Lindlar, Germany.

Steinbach is fan of association football and is an avid supporter of the Bundesliga club Bayer 04 Leverkusen.

=== Compositions ===
	Title (Date); Duration (Listings until May 2014)
1.	[“Neuland”, Mass for band and choir for young people (1976)]
2.	[“Blue Mass” for band and choir for young people (1977)]
3.	[“Beatlesmass” (Arrangement) for band and choir for young people (1978)]
4.	[Piano concerto with band for young people (1980)]; [ ] = not GEMA registered
5.	Suite for piano solo (1982); 7:50
6.	Three Studies for violin solo (1982); 3:55
7.	Three Pieces for clarinet and bassoon (1982); 4:10
8.	Four Three-Part Motets (1982); 4:44
9.	Fünf Bicinien (1982); 3:54
10.	Kyrie Eleison (1982); 1:26
11.	In Hora Ultima (1982); 4:25
12.	Der arme Peter (1982); 2:13
13.	Der Einsiedler (1982); 2:13
14.	In der Fremde (1982); 2:00
15.	Piece for big band (1983); 15:00
16.	Arrangement for jazz combo – Ade nun zur guten Nacht (1983); 4:02
17.	Orchestration of Bartok Suite op. 14 for large orchestra (1983); 9:00
18.	Slapstick Variations for two pianos (1994); 14:03
19.	5 Lyrical Transfers on poems by H. Rosner for voice and piano (1999); 11:27
20.	14 Lyrical Transfers on Poems by B. Bohmeier for voice and piano (1999); 30:22
21.	24 Lyrical Transfers – “Hintergrundimprovisationen” for piano solo (1999); 17:05
22.	Five Birthday Pieces for piano solo (2000); 10:25
23.	Agnesmesse für 5 Chöre, 7 Posaunen, 2 Orgeln, 2 Schlagzeuger, Blockflötenquartett, Kirchenglocken, Sopran und Sprecher (2001) – letzter Teil des fünfteiligen Kirchenzyklus "Apokalypse"- Allen Widerständlern gegen den Nationalsozialismus gewidmet; 29:14
24.	Cadences on W.A. Mozarts Piano Concerto No. 17, KV 453 (2001); 3:50
25.	“Thomasmesse” für Chor, Sopran, Oboe, 4 Blockflöten, 2 Schlagzeuger, Orgel und Kontrabaß (2003) – 1. Teil des fünfteiligen Kirchenzyklus "Apokalypse"; 27:00
26.	“Spero Lucem”, für Sopran und Orgel (2004) – 2. Teil des fünfteiligen Kirchenzyklus "Apokalypse"; 13:00
27.	“Nachts” Subtitle: “Rotationen – Piano Quartett nach einem Text von Franz Kaffka (2004); 16:16
28.	“Accidents” Subtitle: “Is that what it is?” for piano and oboe (2004) 1. Teil des musikalischen Konzepts: "Eclectic Eccentricism"; 9:30
29.	Psalm 27 for choire, organ, 4 recorders and percussion (2005) – 3. Teil des fünfteiligen Kirchenzyklus "Apokalypse"; 8:00
30.	Berlinsuite – Szenische Klangcollage für 4 Sänger, 2 Sprecher, 2 Tänzer, 3 Chöre, Rockband, 3 Streichorchester, Flöte, Oboe, 3 Trompeten, 2 Saxophone, 3 Posaunen, 3 Schlagzeuger, Video, Beleuchtung und Lautsprecher (3 Teile) Untertitel: Ein Klangbad (2006–2011); 78:12
31.	M.E. for piano solo (2006); 3:45
32.	"Figures" 17 choreographic etudes for piano solo (2006); 49:00
33.	"Camp" for piano, oboe and cello (2006) 2. Teil des musikalischen Konzepts"Eclectic Eccentricism"; 10:48
34.	“Mirrorvisions” – “Spiegelvisionen” for piano solo (2007); 5:08
35.	“Moving” – 17 Piano Etudes for Young Pianists (moderate level, age 11–15) / “Beweglich” – 17 Klavieretuden für junge Pianisten (mittlerer Schwierigkeitsgrad, Alter 11–15) (2007); 31:00
36.	“Fingerpaintings” – 17 Piano Etudes for Beginners (easy level, age 6–10) / “Fingerbilder” – 17 Klavieretuden für den Anfang (einfacher Schwierigkeitsgrad, Alter 6–10) (2007); 11:00
37.	“If that helps” – Trio for piano, oboe and viola (2008) 3. Teil des musikalischen Konzepts "Eclectic Eccentricism"; 11:00
38.	Etude 53 – for piano (2008); 4:05
39.	"No, You Are Wrong" – argument between oboe and piano (2009) 4. Teil des musikalischen Konzepts"Eclectic Eccentricism"; 11:00
40.	"Organismen" für Orgel zu 4 Händen (2010); 12:17
40.	Collage für Cello und Klavier (2010); 11:05
41.	"Ode an Berlin" für Solosopran, Oboe, drei gemischte Chöre und drei Streichorchester (2011); 12:03
42.	Vita S. Apollinaris Brevior – Passacaglia für Sopran und Orgel; Architektonische Komposition für die katholische Pfarrkirche St. Apollinaris in Lindlar – Frielingsdorf des Architekten Dominikus Böhm (2012) – 4. Teil des fünfteiligen Kirchenzyklus "Apokalypse"; 24:07
43.	Sandia Casino für Klavier Solo (2012); 5:25
44.	Le Tombeau de Bela Bartok in Keller Hall für Klavier Solo (2012); 13:10
45.	Sechs Violinstücke für Ronja (2012); 7:32
46.	Cadences for W.A.Mozart, Piano Concerto KV 467 (2012); 2:05
47.	"Dream Catcher" for piano solo (2012); 8:03
48.	"Mystic Circle" for small ensemble (2013) – Homage to Igor Strawinsky; 5:05
49.	Camp II for oboe, viola and piano (2013); 12:00
50.	Der Große Ursulazyklus für 4 Blockflöten (2013); 28:02
51.	Jemez River for piano solo (2013); 6:10
52.	A Beautiful Restless Mind for piano solo (2014); 3:55
53.	Raincatcher for piano solo (2014); 4:20
54.	New Mexico Pianoscapes for piano solo – Volume I (2012 – 2014 – work in progress); 41:13

=== List of CD recordings ===
CD	Title
1.	H. Eisler, 3.Sonate; J. Brahms, Fantasies op.116; B. Bartok, Sonate (1926); Falko Steinbach, piano, Ambitus 97862 (1990)
2.	R. Schumann, Sonate op 22; Drei Romanzen op. 28; J. Brahms, Variations op. 9; Falko Steinbach, piano, Ambitus 97882 (1992)
3.	Klassik für Menschenrechte, amnesty international, L.v. Beethoven, Sonata op. 13; J. S. Bach, Two Preludes & Fugues BWV 847 & 858; W.A. Mozart, Sonata KV 309; F. Chopin, Ballade op. 23; B. Bartok, Suite op. 14; Falko Steinbach, piano; Ambitus Best-Nr. 2644916495 A (1995)
4.	C. Debussy, Proses Lyriques; R. Wagner, Wesendonck-Lieder; Anne Schwanewilms, soprano and Falko Steinbach, piano; Ambitus 97982 (1996)
5.	H. Eisler, 44 Lieder aus dem Exil; Marlene Mild, soprano and Falko Steinbach, piano; Ambitus 97843 (1997)
6.	six take, new music for piano; Falko Steinbach, Slapstick Variationen; K. Schwaen, Nocturne Lugubre; T. Medek, Zwischenspiele; S. Thomas, Postludium; C.M. Wagner, “Arabesque”; O. Trötschel, Drei Elegien op. 14; Falko Steinbach, piano;Ambitus 97887 (1997)
7.	Aus der Farbstille, improvisations (Lyrical Transfers) with Falko Steinbach, piano and Marlene Mild, soprano; poetry by Bernd Bohmeier; Verlag und Studio für Hörbuchproduktionen, Beltershausen (1999)
8.	K. Schwaen, Miniaturen, Späte Klavierstücke; Falko Steinbach, piano; Valve – Hearts 2801, LC 02086, Dittrich Verlag, Cologne (2001)
9.	F. Steinbach, Agnesmesse, live recording of the world premiere, Edition Cantio Sacra, Cologne (2002)
10.	Humanity Classics; W.A. Mozart, Klavierkonzert KV 453 (cadenzas by F. Steinbach); A. Copland, Appalachian Spring; A. Schnittke, Concerto Grosso Nr.6; Orpheus Kammerorchester Bulgarien under Raitscho Christov, Yosif Radionov, violine and Falko Steinbach, piano; Antes Edition, Bella Musica 31.9187, Bühl/Baden (2003)
11.	F. Steinbach, Thomasmesse, live recording of the world premiere, Edition Cantio Sacra, Cologne (2003)
12.	forte & piano; Werke von K. Schwaen; Falko Steinbach, piano; Musikbibliothek Marzahn – Hellersdorf, Berlin (2004)
13.	Oboe on the Edge; F. Steinbach, Accidents for Piano and Oboe; Kevin Vigneau, oboe and Falko Steinbach, piano; Centaur Records 2863 (2008)
14.	F. Steinbach, Figures, Mirrorvisions, Etude 53; Falko Steinbach, piano; Centaur Records 2998 (2009)
15.	Devisadero, works by C. Shultis; C. Shultis, Songs of Love and Longing; Divisadero; Falko Steinbach, piano; Navona Records (Parma Recordings 2011)
16.	New Mexico Pianoscapes; F. Steinbach, New Mexico Pianoscapes; F. Chopin, Polonaise Fantasy, op.61; L.v. Beethoven, Sonata, op. 27. No. 2; F. Steinbach, piano; (Pending Release 2016)

== Radio productions ==
Title	Station (Recording)
M.C. Redel, Triade op. 34 für Klavier	WDR (5-17-1993, Kleiner Sendesaal)
Th. Medek, Zwischenspiele für Klavier	WDR (5-17-1993, Kleiner Sendesaal)
F. Schubert, Impromtu op. 90 Nr. 3	WDR (10-6-1994, Festhalle Viersen)
F. Schubert, Impromtu op. 90 Nr. 4	WDR (10-6-1994, Festhalle Viersen)
F. Schubert, Impromtu op. 142 Nr. 3	WDR (10-6-1994, Festhalle Viersen)
F. Chopin, Impromtu op. 36	WDR (10-6-1994, Festhalle Viersen)
C. Debussy, Prelude Band II Nr. 1	WDR (10-6-1994, Festhalle Viersen)
C. Debussy, Prelude Band II Nr. 4	WDR (10-6-1994, Festhalle Viersen)
H. Eisler, 44 Lieder (B. Brecht)	WDR (4–14, 8–20, 8–27,1997, Funkhaus, Saal 2)
Radio Live Recording	Station (Recording)
O. Trötschel, Drei Elegien op. 14	WDR (5-14-1991, Kammermusiksaal der Musikhochschule, Köln)
D. Lötfering, "Portrait" für Cello und Klavier	WDR (5-14-1991, Kammermusiksaal der Musikhochschule, Köln mit Francoise Groben, Cello)
A. Webern, Sonate für Cello und Klavier (1914)	WDR (3-1-1994, Bürgerhaus Alte Feuerwache, Köln mit Francoise Groben, Cello)
P. Hindemith, Sonate für Cello und Klavier op. 11,3	WDR (3-1-1994, Bürgerhaus Alte Feuerwache, Köln mit Francoise Groben, Cello)
H. Eisler, "Reisesonate" für Violine und Klavier	WDR (3-1-1994, Bürgerhaus Alte Feuerwache, Köln mit Lev Guelbard, Violine)
H. Eisler, Fünf Ausgewählte Lieder (B. Brecht)	WDR (5-10-1994, Käthe- Kollwitz- Museum, Köln mit Marlene Mild, Sopran)
H. Eisler, Fünf Elegien (B. Brecht)	WDR (5-10-1994, Käthe- Kollwitz- Museum, Köln mit Marlene Mild, Sopran)
J. Weismann, Das Mädchen, Bodensee, Fieber	WDR (5-10-1994, Käthe- Kollwitz- Museum, Köln mit Marlene Mild, Sopran)
J. Weismann, Variationen für Violine und Klavier op. 39	WDR (5-10-1994, Käthe- Kollwitz- Museum, Köln mit Lev Guelbard, Violine)
H. Unger, Auf den Tod eines Kindes op. 21	WDR (5-10-1994, Käthe- Kollwitz- Museum, Köln mit Marlene Mild, Sopran)
H. Eisler, "Reisesonate" für Violine und Klavier	WDR (5-10-1994, Käthe- Kollwitz- Museum, Köln mit Lev Guelbard, Violine)
P. Dessau, Les Voix für Ensemble	NDR (9-8-1994, Musikfest Hamburg, Fabrik)
P. Dessau, Andante für Violine und Klavier	NDR (9-8-1994, Musikfest Hamburg, Fabrik mit Berthold Holewik, Violine)
P. Dessau, Quattrodramma für Ensemble	NDR (9-8-1994, Musikfest Hamburg, Fabrik)
O. Trötschel, Drei Elegien op. 14	NDR (1-29-1998, NDR Landesfunkhaus Niedersachsen, Kleiner Sendesaal)
O. Trötschel, Zwei Gesänge nach R.M.Rilke op. 28	NDR (1-29-1998, NDR-Landesfunkhaus Niedersachsen, Kleiner Sendesaal mit Marlene Mild, Sopran)

== World premieres ==
Description	Recording
Falko Steinbach, Suite in Three Movements	6-26-1984, Kammermusiksaal der Musikhochschule Köln
Falko Steinbach, Slapstick Variations for two pianos	5-10-1996, Belgisches Haus, Cologne; with Andreas Wegener 2nd piano
Falko Steinbach, Five Birthday Pieces	4-20-2002, Historic Old San Ysidro Church, Corrales, New Mexico; version for piano
Falko Steinbach, Five Birthday Pieces	6-6-2002, Bürgerhaus Alte Feuerwache, Cologne, version for prepared piano
Falko Steinbach/Marlene Mild, Nine Lyrical Transfers on Poems by Bernd Bohmeier, improvisations on CD: Aus der Farbstille (Ferien, Ich bin, Schwäne gehen über Land, Regen zerbeißt die Wolken, Natur der Dinge, Leer das Zimmer, Vorschläge zur Güte, Ein Licht, Holzeinschlag)	9-7-1999, Schloß Morsbroich, Leverkusen
Falko Steinbach/Marlene Mild, Five Lyrical Transfers on Poems by Bernd Bohmeier, improvisations on CD: Aus der Farbstille (Die Sonne schmilzt, Liebesbeute, Nachlaß eines Menschenfreundes, Im September, ?)	9-7-1999, Schloß Morsbroich, Leverkusen
Falko Steinbach, twenty four background improvisations (wallpaper music)	9-7-1999, Schloß Morsbroich, Leverkusen
Falko Steinbach/Marlene Mild, Five Lyrical Transfers on Poems by Herbert Rosner (Viele Dinge, Wenn ich so zaghaft, wohin wankt Dein Schatten, Baßtanz, Jahreszeiten-Gebetsmühle)	6-6-2002, Bürgerhaus Alte Feuerwache, Cologne
Falko Steinbach, At Night for piano quartet and cd	3-26-2004, Macey Center, Socorro, New Mexico; with Bernhard Zink, violine, Willy Sucre, viola and David Schepps, violoncello
Falko Steinbach, Accidents for piano and oboe	11-8-2004, Keller Hall, Albuquerque, University of New Mexico; with Kevin Vigneau, oboe
Falko Steinbach, Figures – 17 Choreographic Etudes for piano solo	12-7-2006, Keller Hall, Albuquerque, University of New Mexico
Falko Steinbach, Camp for piano, oboe, violoncello and cd	9-30-2006, Keller Hall, Albuquerque, University of New Mexico; with Kevin Vigneau, oboe and David Schepps, violoncello
Falko Steinbach, Mirrorvisions	12-3-2007, Keller Hall, Albuquerque, University of New Mexico
Falko Steinbach, If That Helps for piano, oboe and viola	12-7-2008, Keller Hall, Albuquerque, University of New Mexico; with Kevin Vigneau and Kimberly Fredenburgh, viola
Falko Steinbach, Etude 53	12-7-2008, Keller Hall, Albuquerque, University of New Mexico
Falko Steinbach, No, You Are Wrong, argument between oboe and piano	12-6-2009, Keller Hall, Albuquerque, University of New Mexico; with Kevin Vigneau, oboe
Falko Steinbach, Collage for violoncello and piano	4-16-2011, Kaisersaal, Brauweiler; with Judith Ermert, violoncello
Wilhelm Hans, 6 Nicht Durchgeführte Ohrlinge für Horn, Violine und Klavier	2-20-1986, Aula der Musikhochschule Köln; with Wolfgang Wübbena, horn and Klaus Schwamm, violine
Wilhelm Hans, 3 ½ Klavierstücke	5-20-1987, Lecture Recital Room, Guildhall School of Music and Drama, Barbican Center, London
Wilhelm Hans, Klavierkonzert “Giorno per Giorno”	12-8-1989, Aula der Musikhochschule Köln; Orchestra of the Musikhochschule Cologne and Johannes Stert, conductor
Oliver Trötschel, 3 Elegien op.14 für Klavier	3-23-1990, Belgisches Haus, Cologne
Oliver Trötschel, Zwei Gesänge nach Gedichten von R.M.Rilke op. 28	5-9-1997, Bürgerhaus alte Feuerwache; with Marlene Mild, soprano
Thomas Reiner, From Dawn to Spring (1984)	3-23-1990, Belgisches Haus, Cologne; with Marlene Mild, soprano
Paul Dessau, Andante für Violine und Klavier “Zum 50. Geburtstag von Albert Einstein” (1929)	9-8-1994, with Berthold Holewik, violine
Manfred Klink, Trio Nostalgico für Oboe, Viola und Klavier	8-24-1996, Falterhof; with Margot Lobmann, oboe and Manfred Klink, viola
Ferdinand Henkemeyer, Wandelhin-Taumelher	10-2-1996, Kunststation St. Peter, Cologne; with Stefanie Wüst and others
Stefan Thomas, Postludium	11-28-1996, Rathaussaal Bensberg
Kurt Schwaen, Preludio patetico	6-21-1997, Kurt Schwaen Archiv, Berlin-Hellersdorf
Kurt Schwaen, Tanzbüchlein Teil I	11-17-2001, Keller Hall, Albuquerque, University of New Mexico
Kurt Schwaen, Tanzbüchlein Teil II, (Ah, die schöne Balletteuse, Zigeunertanz)	4-20-2002, Historic Old San Ysidro Church, Corrales, New Mexico
Kurt Schwaen, Tanzbüchlein Teil II (all other pieces)	6-3-2002, Musikbibliothek Marzahn-Hellersdorf, Berlin
Kurt Schwaen, Lyrische Stücke	6-6-2002, Bürgerhaus Alte Feuerwache, Cologne
Kurt Schwaen, from: Fünf Lieder nach Gedichten von Johann Wolfgang v.Goethe: April, Elemente	6-6-2002, with Marlene Mild, soprano
Kurt Schwaen, from: Die Nacht hindurch: Durch das Finstre, Die Nacht hindurch, Die Erde tanzt, Jetzt	6-30-2004, Aula der Universität zu Köln
Kurt Schwaen, Filigran	12-3-2007, Keller Hall, Albuquerque, University of New Mexico
Kurt Schwaen, Stille	12-7-2008, Keller Hall, Albuquerque, University of New Mexico
Erwin Kuckertz, from: Fünf Lieder nach Texten von C. Morgenstern: Das Gebet, Das aesthetische Wiesel, Der Papagei	6-30-2004, Aula der Universität zu Köln; with Marlene Mild, soprano
Chris Shultis, Romantic Miniatures	11-8-2002, Highlands University, Las Vegas, New Mexico
Chris Shultis, Songs of Love and Longing	4-30-2004, Keller Hall, Albuquerque, University of New Mexico; with Leslie Umphrey, soprano
Chris Shultis, Devisadero-Six Preludes for Piano Solo	4-1-2008, Keller Hall, Albuquerque, University of New Mexico, John Donald Robb Symposium
Falko Steinbach, New Mexico Pianoscapes for Piano Solo	9-19-2014, Keller Hall, Albuquerque, University of New Mexico
