= Italian ship Falco =

Falco has been the name of at least three ships of the Italian Navy and may refer to:

- Italian torpedo boat Falco, a torpedo boat launched in 1888.
- Italian cruiser Falco, an Aquila-class scout cruiser ordered by Romania in 1913 as Viscol but not laid down before Italy took over the order and renamed her. Transferred to Spain, unofficially in 1937 and officially in 1939, as Ceuta. Stricken in 1948 and scrapped.
- Italian aircraft carrier Falco, previously the passenger liner MS Augustus. Conversion started in 1942 with the name Falco and then renamed Sparviero but the conversion was never finished. She was seized by Germany in 1943 and scuttled in 1944.
