= Gobelet André Falquet =

18th century silver-gilt cup

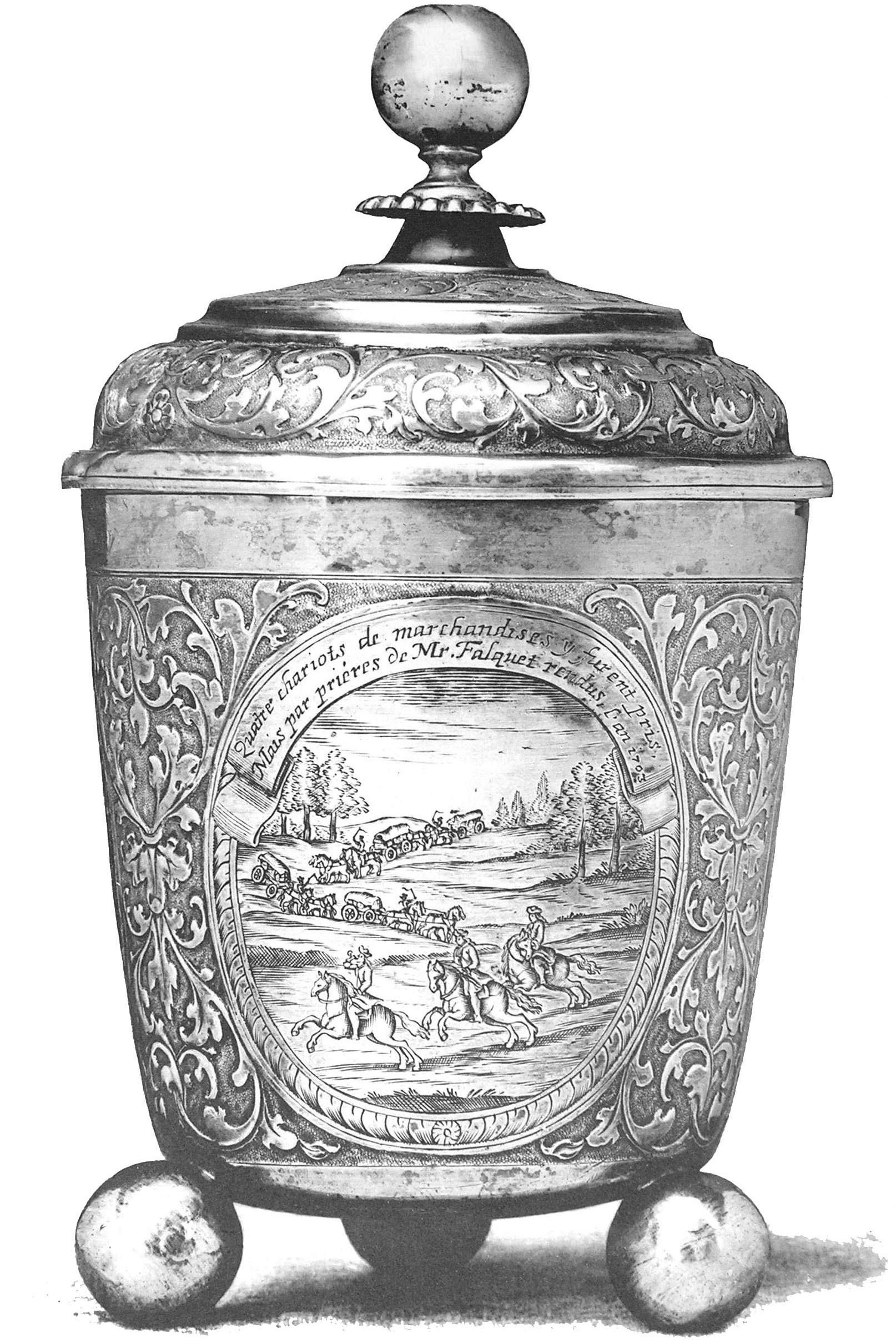
Gobelet d'André Falquet, view on first medallion.

The Gobelet André Falquet is a silver-gilt cup with cover made in the 18th century by Hans-Matthias Rehm of Augsburg for the Swiss merchant André Falquet, which is kept in the Maison Tavel (Musées d'Art et d'Histoire Genève) in Geneva under inventory number G 834.

In French it is a gobelet; the English derivative goblet now implies a cup with a stem (like most chalices or wineglasses).

== Description ==
The diameter at the top is 12 centimetres, and the cup stands on three soldered balls that raise the cup by about two centimetres. The outside of the cup is decorated with engravings. These are beautifully drawn and elaborate arabesque ornaments. Three oval medallions show different subjects and are captioned to the story below. Further text and two coats of arms are found on the underside of the cup; they are those of André Falquet and the city of Augsburg. A lid completes the piece. It consists of an undecorated closing rim and a quarter-round decorated rim; separated by an almost flat intermediate piece, a cone with a little crown and a sphere at the top rises from it. The cup is made of gilded silver. Except for the feet and the medallions, the gilding is complete. The total height of the cup is 22 centimetres and it weighs 552 grams.

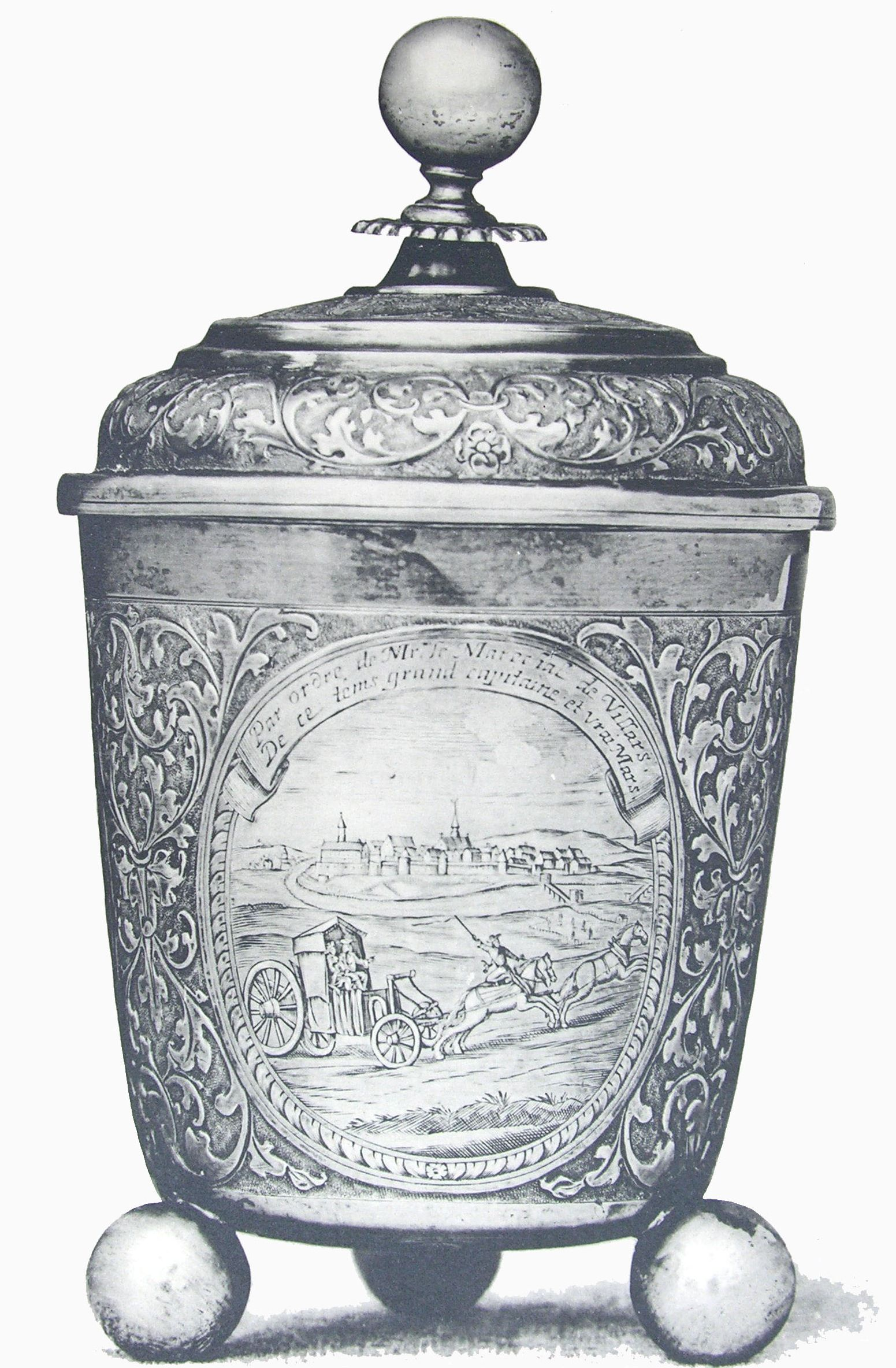
View on second medallion.

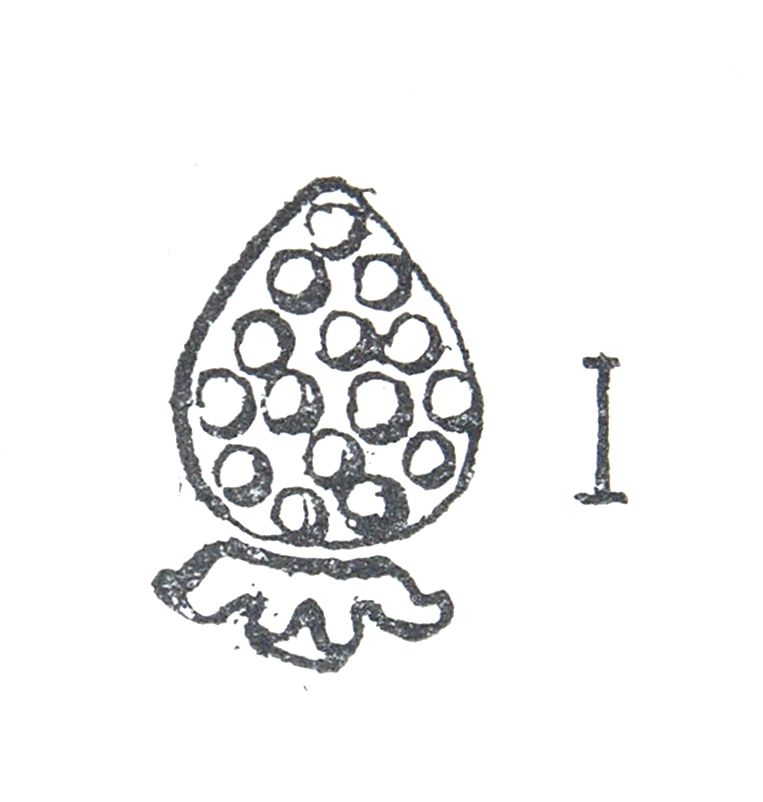
Hallmark "Augsburg"

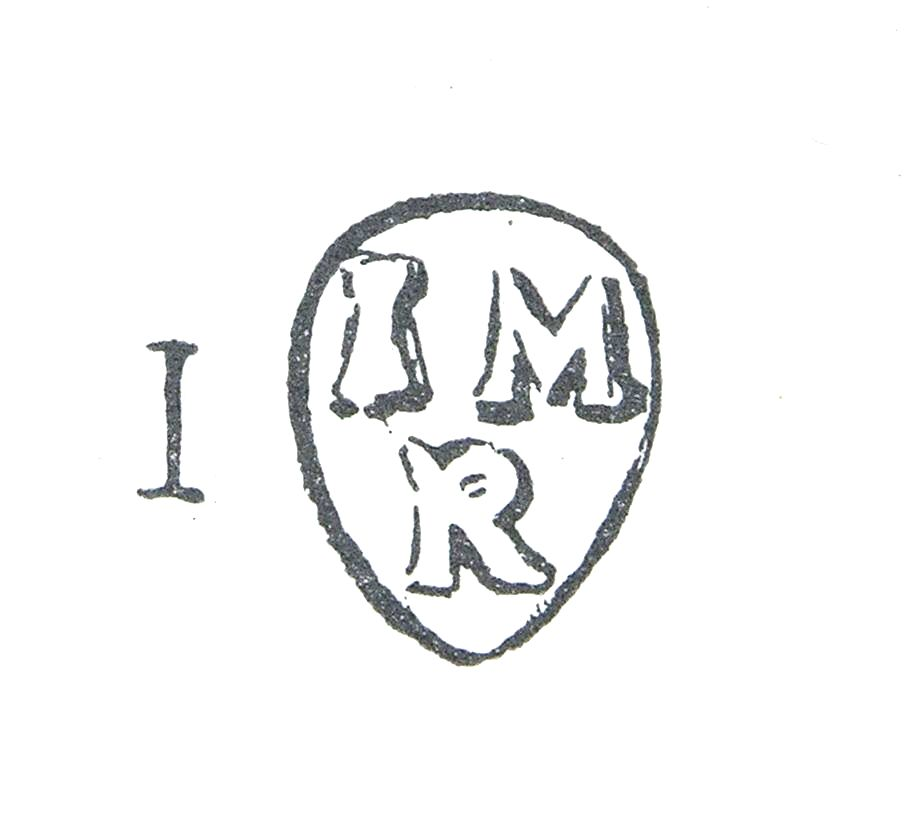
Hallmark "I M R"

== History ==
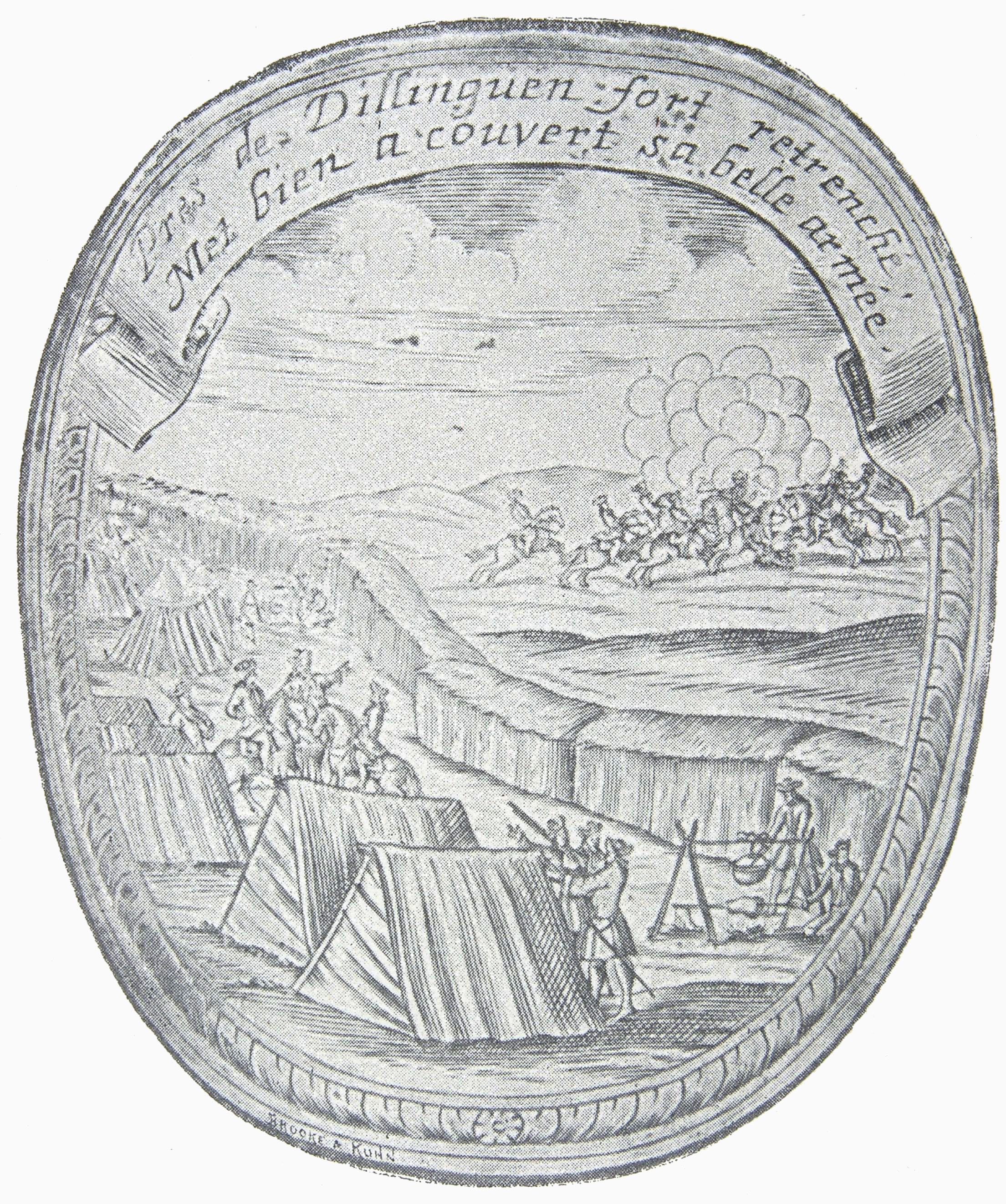
Third medallion

The Gobelet is an award of recognition to the Geneva citizen and later nobleman André Falquet. It was awarded to him by the city of Augsburg in 1703 during the turmoil of the War of the Spanish Succession. The reason for this was a petition by Falquet - who spoke French - to Marshal Claude Louis Hector de Villars, who was commanding the French troops in Bavaria at the time. André Falquet's mission was to redeem four richly laden wagons of merchandise confiscated by the (French) commander of Bavaria in Donauwörth. These had been on their way from Nuremberg to Augsburg without valid freight documents. André Falquet succeeded in doing so and was honoured by the citizens of Augsburg with the Gobelet.

The recipient of the art object, André Falquet, was a merchant in Geneva. He was born in 1687 and died in 1755. He was ennobled by Charles VI in 1725 for supplying goods important to the war effort to the Imperial army in the War of the Spanish Succession.

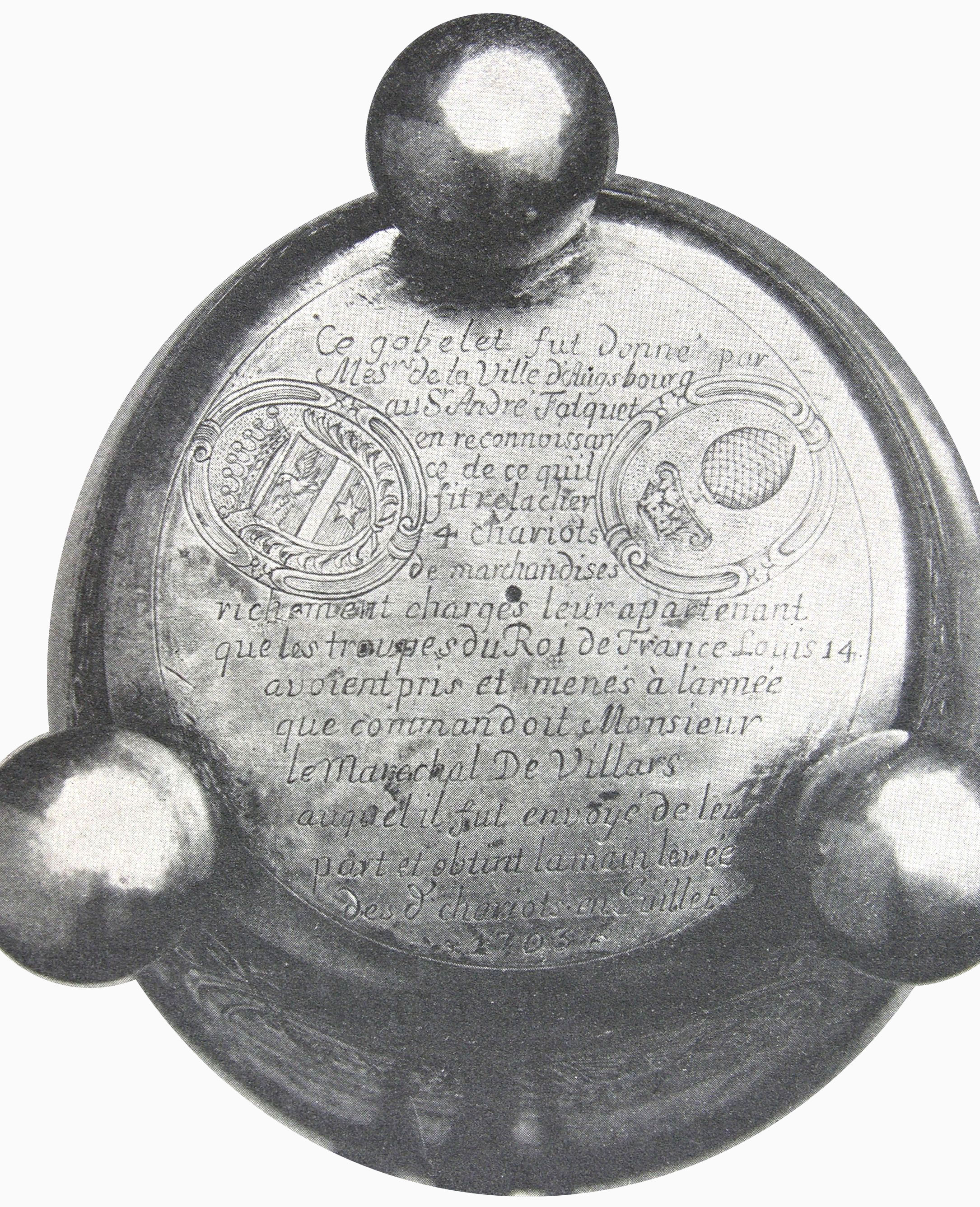
Bottom

The cup was donated by the people of Geneva to the people of Vaud in 1815. In November 1894, it was acquired by the Musée Fol in Geneva with the help of a special donation (French souscription particulière) before being transferred from the Musée Fol to the Musées d'Art et d'Histoire in 1899.

== Creator ==
The artist who created this art object was called Jean-Mathieu Rehm (or Hans-Matthias Rehm) and came from Augsburg. An analogue of the Gobelet André Falquet was still on display at the National Museum in Budapest at the beginning of the 20th century.

== Literature ==
- Haller, J.; Brügger, S.: Adelsbrief André Falquet – Aspekte einer kaiserlichen Urkunde von 1725. Aarau, 2007.
