= Matt Fulks =

American sportswriter and broadcaster

Matt Fulks is an American sports journalist, author, broadcaster and feature writer. He has written for Kansas City's Metro Sports, and his work has appeared in various newspapers and publications including The Kansas City Star and USA Today's Sports Weekly.

== Professional life ==
Fulks started his journalism career while attending Lipscomb University in Nashville, Tennessee, as a play-by-play broadcaster on radio, a producer for WSMV-TV, sports director for WAKM radio and a sports writer with the Review-Appeal.

After leaving the newspaper business, Fulks began working as a freelance writer and author. He has written more than 25 books with various sports figures including Marcus Allen, Frank White, Tom Flores, and broadcasters Max Falkenstien, Fred White and Denny Matthews. He's also written two books for CBS Sports, Stories from the Final Four and Super Bowl Sunday: The Day America Stops. He's hosted a syndicated sports talk show, Behind the Stats. Fulks is currently the Executive Director of the C You In The Major Leagues Foundation.

== Works ==
- "Behind the Stats: Tennessee's Coaching Legends"
- "The Sportscaster's Dozen"
- "Play by Play," with Denny Matthews and Fred White
- "CBS Sports Presents: Stories from the Final Four"
- "Super Bowl Sunday: The Day America Stops"
- "Tales from the Oakland Raiders," with Tom Flores
- "The Road to Canton," with Marcus Allen
- "Good As Gold," with Frank White
- "Tales from the Royals Dugout," with Denny Matthews
- "Echoes of Kansas Basketball"
- "More Than The Score"
- "A Good Place to Stop," with Max Falkenstien and Doug Vance
- "The Good, The Bad & The Ugly: Pittsburgh Steelers"
- "Hi, Anybody!" with Denny Matthews
- "Wooden"
- "For Jayhawks Fans Only"
- "Relentless," with Travis Releford
- "Conversations at Chappell's"
- "100 Things Royals Fans Should Know and Do Before They Die"
- "If These Walls Could Talk: Kansas City Royals," with Jeff Montgomery
- "100 Things Chiefs Fans Should Know and Do Before They Die"
- "Out of the Blue"
- "More Than A Season," with Dayton Moore
- "Taking The Crown"
- "Let 'Em Play," with Dr. Andrew Jacobs, Pete Malone and Jeff Montgomery

== Personal life ==
Fulks, a native of Overland Park, Kansas, lives in the Kansas City area with his wife and three kids, two Weimaraners named after Elvis, and a mid-life crisis Jeep.
