= Falco Electronics =

Mexican electronics company

Falco Electronics Corporation
- Industry: Consumer Electronics
- Founded: 1991; 35 years ago
- Headquarters: Mérida, Mexico
- Products: Electromagnetic components
- Website: www.falco.com

Falco Electronics is a multinational Mexican electronics corporation founded in 1991, in Mérida, Yucatán, Mexico. The company sells products under its own name and also acts as an ODM, OEM and ECM/EMS.

== Products and services ==
Falco's main business activities are the design and manufacture of power magnetics, semiconductors and circuitboards. In addition the company designs and manufactures common mode chokes, current sensors, gate drives, power inductors, line transformers, THT inductors, watt hour meters, lighting systems, printed computer boards, mechanical assembly systems, and also provides plastic molding, metal stamping and electronic manufacturing, OEM design and testing services. Falco is a major supplier to international OEMs and brand name electronics manufacturers alike. Falco has regionalized branches in Los Angeles and Miami in the United States; Munich, Germany; Milan, Desenzano, and Bologna, Italy; Manila, The Philippines, Bangalore, India; Xiamen, China and Hong Kong. Falco has manufacturing plants in Mexico, China and India.
