= Jean-Louis Falquet =

Jean-Louis Falquet (19 November 1768 in Geneva – 6 November 1842 in Geneva) was a Genevan politician and banker.

== Life ==
=== Business career ===
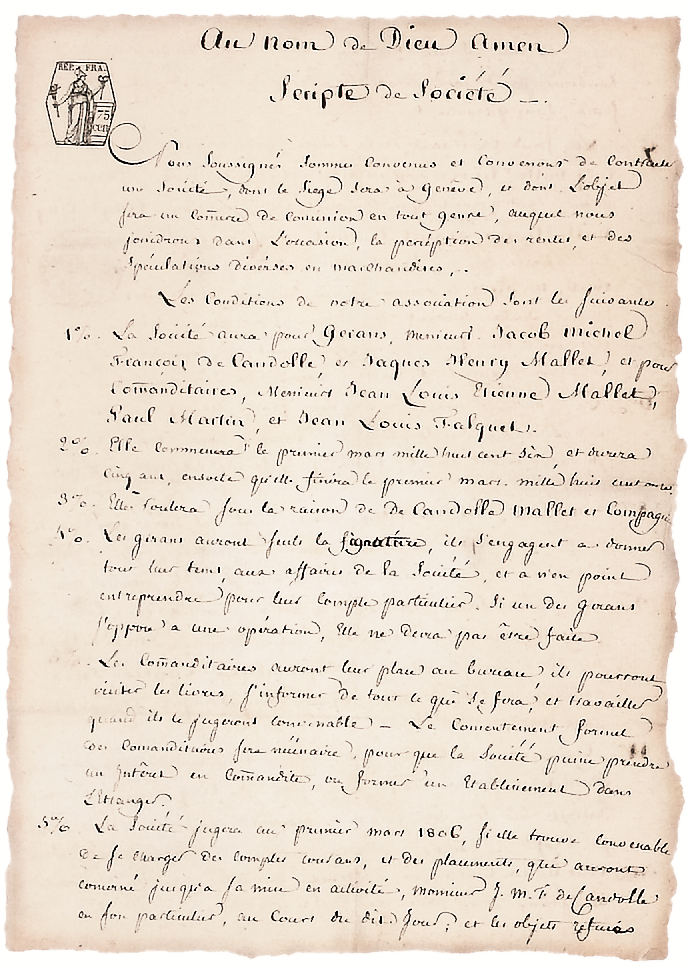
Certificate of Incorporation of the Bank De Candolle Mallet & Cie (1805)

Together with four other limited partners, he founded the bank De Candolle Mallet & Cie in Geneva on 23 July 1805, the day on which the partnership's deed of incorporation was signed. Today, the bank is known as the Pictet Group.

=== Military career ===
Falquet was an officer in the French army, which is why he was "banished for life in absentia", (bannis à perpétuité par contumace) in the First Geneva Revolutionary Court (Le premier tribunal révolutionnaire Genevois) in the summer of 1794.

=== Political career ===
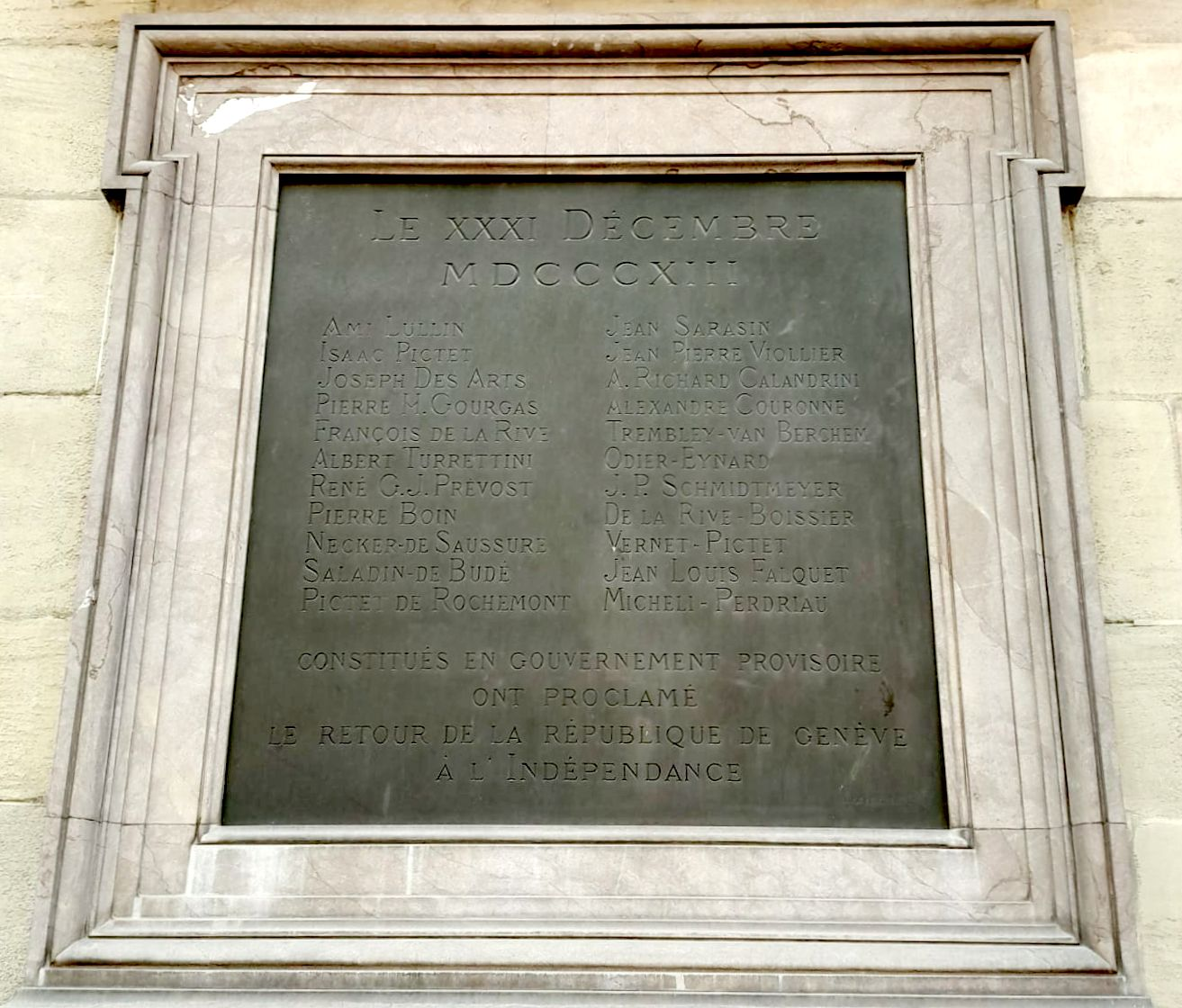
Inscription engraved in marble on the Hôtel de Ville de Genève, commemorating the restoration in 1813, installed in 1892.

Falquet was a member of the Geneva government during and after the Restoration:

- 1813 Member of the Provisional Council (one of 22) that restored the Republic of Geneva on 31 December 1813
- 1814 Clerk of State
- 1815 Member of the Council of State (Conseil de l'État) and sole State Clerk
- 1816 Second Clerk of State.
  As he was elected Syndic in 1817, he was unable to complete his function as Secretary of State, to which he had been elected for nine years in 1815.
- 1817 Syndic de la garde (fourth of four syndics)
- 1818 Member of the Council of State (Conseil de l'Etat) (as second Ancien Syndic out of 2+9 members from the surrounding countryside (treille), total 22)
- 1819 Syndic (second Syndic from the surrounding countryside (treille) out of two)
- 1820 Diet (first of three, head of delegation)
- 1820 Member of the Council of State (Conseil de l'Etat) (second ancien syndic of 2+9 members from the surrounding country (treille), total 20)
- 1821 Member of the Council of State (Conseil de l'Etat) (fourth out of 11 members from the surrounding countryside (treille), total 20)
- 1822 Member of the Council of State (Conseil de l'Etat) (fourth of 11 members from the surrounding countryside (treille), total 20)
- 1823 First Syndic
- 1824 Member of the Council of State (Conseil de l'Etat) (first of 11 members from the city, total 22)
- 1825 Member of the Council of State (Conseil de l'Etat) (fifth of 11 members from the city, total 22)[
- 1826 Member of the Council of State (Conseil de l'Etat) (fourth out of 12 members from the city, total 24)
- 1827 Member of the Council of State (Conseil de l'Etat) (fourth of 11 members from the city, total 22)
- 1828 Member of the Council of State (Conseil de l'Etat) (second of 9+2 members from the city, total 22)
- 1828 President of the Commission of Municipalities
- 1829 Member of the Council of State (Conseil de l'Etat) (second of 9+2 members from the city, total 22)
- 1829 Third (of three) envoy to the Diet
- Member of the Council of State (Conseil de l'Etat) (second of 9+2 members from the surrounding countryside (treille), total 22)
- 1831 Member of the Council of State (Conseil de l'Etat) (second of 9+2 members from the city, total 22)
- 1839 (second semester) 1 of 24 members from the Representative Council on the Court of Appeal

== Memorials and medailles ==
- On 31 December 1892, the names of the 22 members of the provisional government of 31 December 1813 were engraved in a marble plaque on the façade to the left (east) of the main entrance to the Maison de Ville, in commemoration of the restoration of the Republic.
- Medal commemorating the 80th anniversary of the Restoration of the Republic of Geneva (1813), in memory of Ami Lullin and the Comité de l'Indépendance, minted in 1893.

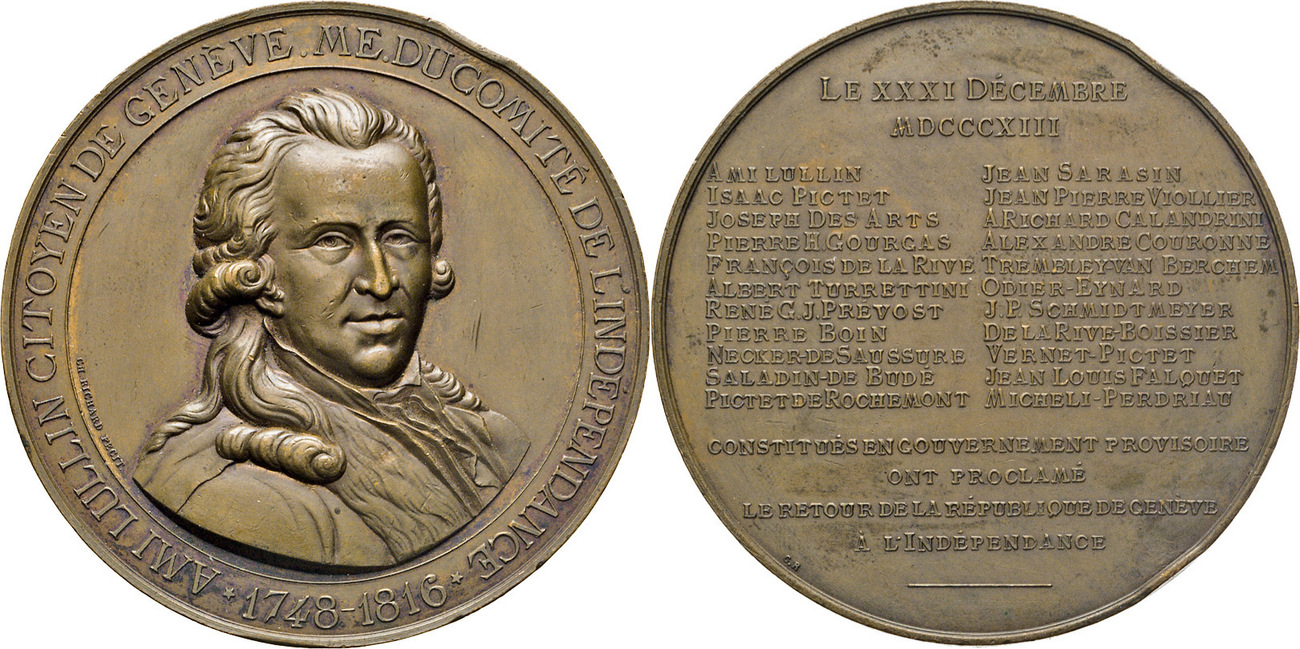

== Family ==
Falquet's paternal ancestors were Jean Robert Falquet (1741-1819), a member of the Small Council, and his father was André Falquet, a merchant and politician.

- From 27 July to 7 August 1888, a succession question was discussed at the Court of Appeal in re Grove, in which the question was whether cousins of initially illegitimate children, who were "legitimised" by subsequent marriage, were entitled to inherit as "next of kin". Documents can also be found in Geneva.

== Literature ==
- Olivier Perroux (2003): Tradition, vocation et progrès. Les élites bourgeoises de Genève (1814-1914), Thèse de doctorat, Université de Genève. Seite 253 Fussnote 663. rero.ch (pdf)
- "Jean-Louis Falquet" in German, French and Italian in the online Historical Dictionary of Switzerland.
- Burgy, Etienne: "Jean-Louis Falquet" in German, French and Italian in the online Historical Dictionary of Switzerland. Version of 6 January 2003.
- geneanet.org - Jean Louis Falquet
