= Falco (surname) =

Falco or Falcó is the surname of:

- Falco (musician) (1957–1998), Austrian singer and musician
- Albert Falco (1927–2012), diving companion of Jacques Cousteau, chief diver and later captain of the RV Calypso
- Carlos Falcó, 5th Marquess of Griñón (1937–2020), Spanish noble
- Charles M. Falco (born 1948), American experimental physicist
- Domenico Falco (born 1985), Italian footballer
- Edie Falco (born 1963), American actress
- Federico Falco (table tennis) (born 1994), Italian para table tennis player
- Filippo Falco (born 1992), Italian footballer
- Hubert Falco (born 1947), French politician
- Louis Falco (1942–1993), American dancer and choreographer
- Luis Falcó (1949–2007), Argentine physician and politician
- Manolo Falcó (born 1964), Spanish banker and 13th Marquess of Castel-Moncayo
- Mathea Falco (born 1944), expert in drug abuse prevention and treatment
- Mark Falco (born 1960), English former footballer
- Randy Falco (born 1953), CEO of Univision Communications
- Robert Falco (1882–1960), a French judge at the Nuremberg trials
- David Berkowitz, serial killer, born Richard David Falco in 1953
- Tav Falco (born 1945), musician
