= Folke Heybroek =

Dutch artist

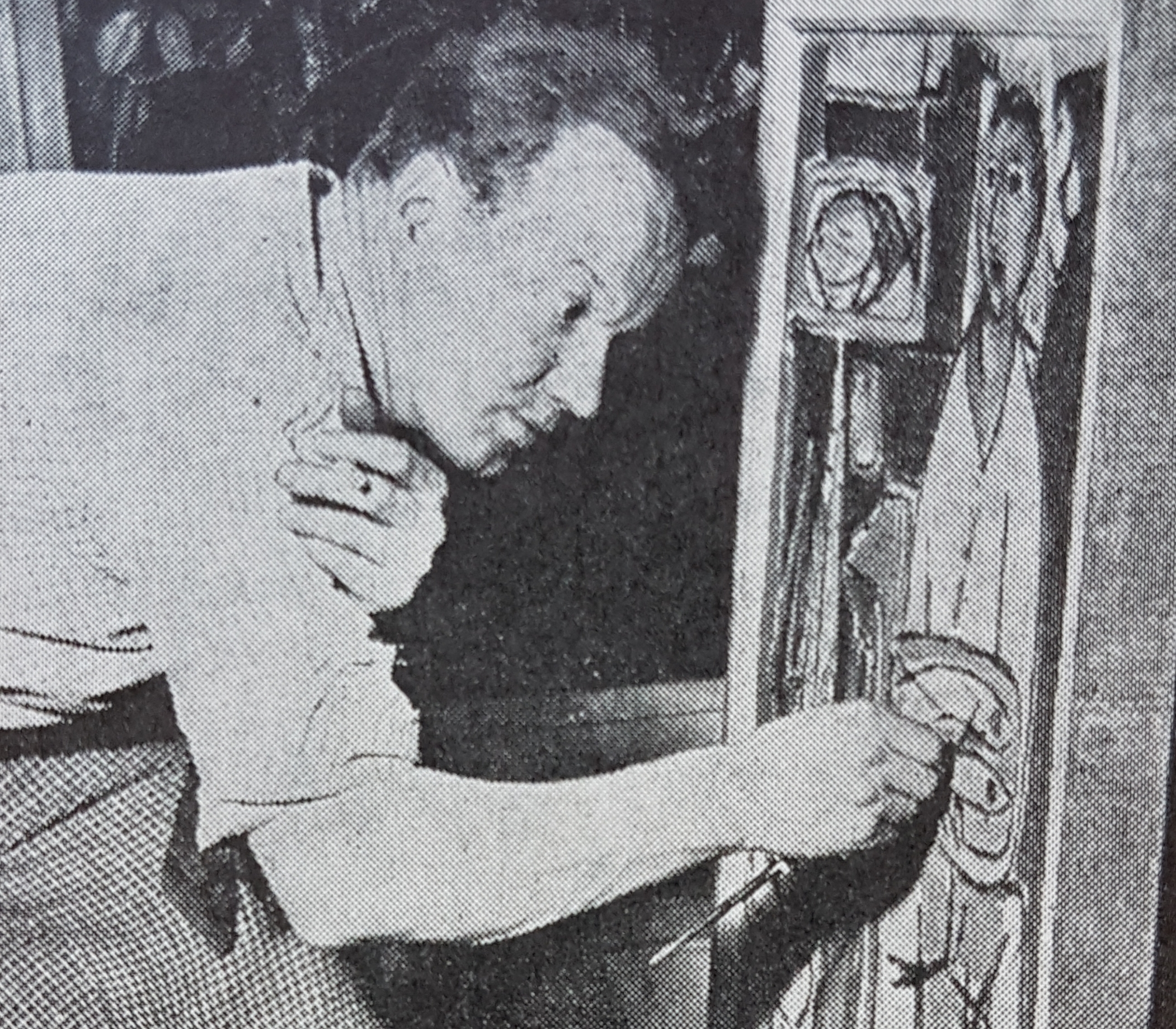
- Born: 2 September 1913; Amsterdam, Netherlands
- Died: 28 February 1983 (aged 69)
- Other name: Folke Marius Heybroek
- Spouse: Brita Horn-Heybroek

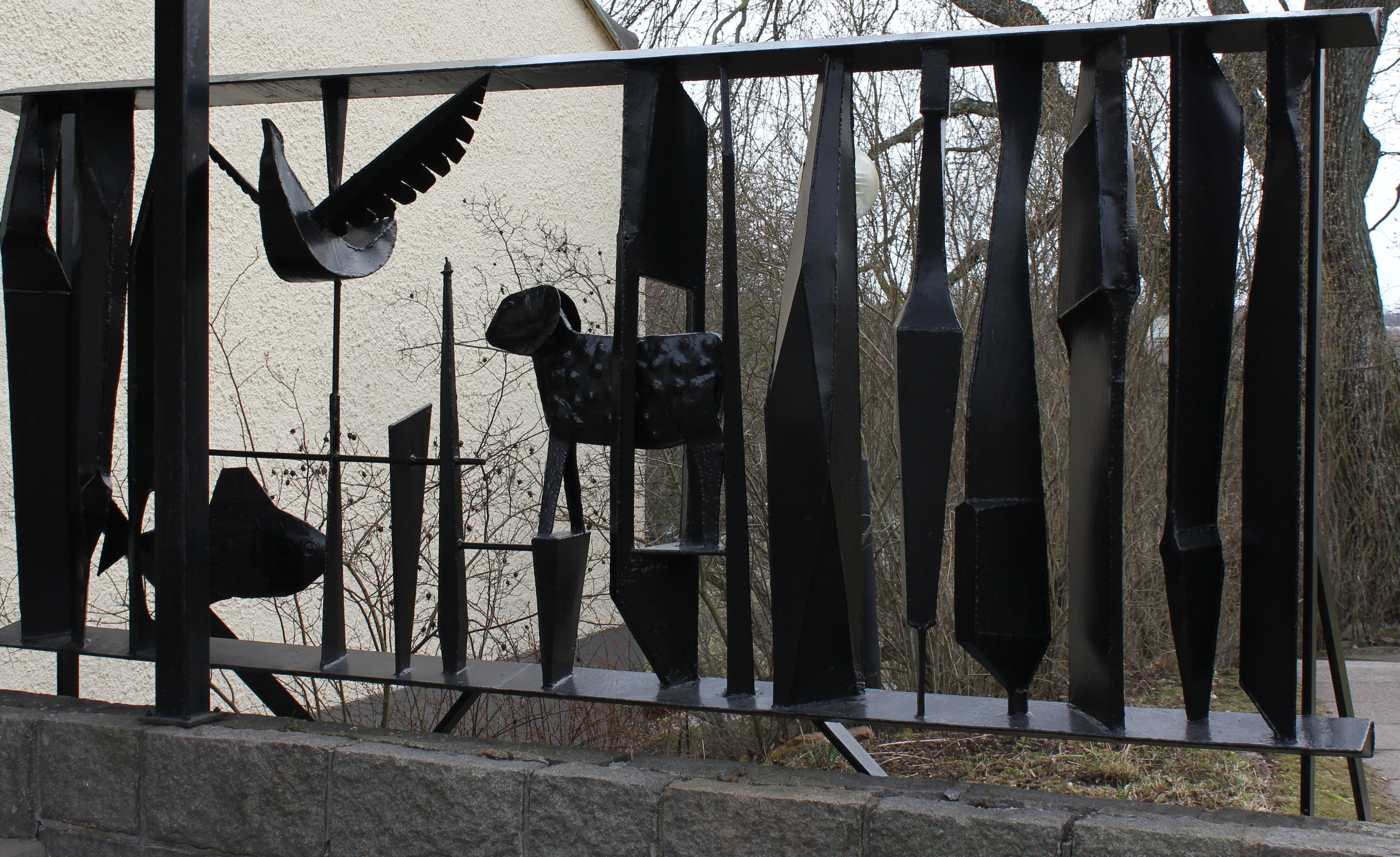

Folke Heybroek (September 2, 1913 – February 28, 1983) was a Dutch expressionist artist, monumental sculptor, illustrator, textile designer and stained-glass designer who spent his professional life in Sweden where his monumental works decorate more than 70 public spaces, churches and schools. Both he and his wife, Brita Horn-Heybroek, were prominent members of the prestigious Eskilstuna Art Society.

== Early life ==
Folke Heybroek was born in Amsterdam to a Dutch banker and Swedish mother and was the youngest of four brothers. He studied art at the Amsterdam Rijksakademie under Heinrich Campendonk (1889–1957) a German expressionist who taught Decorative Art, printmaking and stained-glass.

In 1938 Heybroek met his wife Brita Horn (born 1905) in the fishing village of Nordingrå, Sweden, where he was painting landscapes. She was a Swedish aristocrat who had studied art at the Konstakademie in Stockholm, travelled through Italy and Sicily, and become both an accomplished painter and published art critic.

== Working life ==
In 1939 Heybroek married Brita Horn in Birger Jarlsgatan, Stockholm; had his first solo exhibition at the van Lier gallery in Amsterdam; and moved to Monreale near Palermo in Sicily. The same year his work was included in the exhibition and sale Onze Kunst van Heden (Our Art of Today) at the Rijksmuseum in Amsterdam.

In 1940, only Horn's Swedish nationality prevented their internment by the fascist Italian authorities. Thus their first daughter, Mieke Marion, was born in Mariefred near Stockholm in June 1940.

In 1942 Heybroek held a critically acclaimed exhibition at the Gummeson Gallery in Stockholm, selling circa 60 works, oil paintings, gouaches and drawings, his expressionistic style at this stage was strongly redolent of Van Gogh. This show lead to a commission for the mural Midsummer for a factory canteen and started a career of public murals, sculptures and stained glass work. Throughout his career he created decorative art, public sculpture, installations and stained glass windows for more than thirty churches and forty schools plus courthouses and community halls.

In the late 1940s Heybroek formed a professional partnership with the interior designer Alice Lund whereby he contributed abstract textile designs, an example of which still hangs in the courthouse in Borlänge.

In the early 1950s Heybroek illustrated a Swedish compendium of Greek Mythology and a copy of Homer's Iliad.

Since 1959 his sculpture of animals depicting human vices and virtues has fronted the Sala judicial center in Västmanland.

Heybroek died on 28 February 1983 in Zierikzee

== Public works ==
1943 Midsummer, L.M.K. Machine Tools, Skefco, Sweden
1961 Earth, Wind, Sea, Eriksbergs School, Granitvägen, Sweden
1980 The Chancel Window, Oglunda Church, Sweden
???? Steel Balustrade, SSAB (Svenskt Stål AB), Domnarvet Steel Works, Stora Kopperberg
???? Six Days of Creation, Falun Community Centre.
???? Story of Brewing, Carlsberg's Falcon brewery, Falkenberg.
???? Church at Ånge, Västernorrlands län, Sweden
???? Church at Östersund,
???? Church at Hörken
???? Church at Aspeboda
???? School at Lerum
???? School at Kalix, Upsala, Sweden
???? School at Uppsala.
