= List of newspapers in Arkansas =

This is a list of newspapers in Arkansas, USA.

== Daily newspapers and online publications (currently published) ==
Title	Locale	Year est.	Frequency	Owner	Notes
MySaline	Benton		Daily	Shelli Poole	
Batesville Daily Guard	Batesville		Daily	Paxton Media Group	
The Saline Courier	Benton	1876	Daily	Horizon Publications	Notes
The Camden News	Camden		Daily	WEHCO Media	
Log Cabin Democrat	Conway		Daily	Paxton Media Group	
El Dorado News-Times	El Dorado		Daily	WEHCO Media	
Northwest Arkansas Democrat-Gazette	Fayetteville		Daily	WEHCO Media/ Stephens Media	
Southwest Times Record	Fort Smith		Daily	GateHouse Media	
The Harrison Daily Times	Harrison	1876	Daily	Carpenter Media Group	
Hot Springs Sentinel-Record	Hot Springs		Daily	WEHCO Media	
The Jonesboro Sun	Jonesboro		Daily	Paxton Media Group	
Arkansas Democrat-Gazette	Little Rock		Daily	WEHCO Media	
The Baxter Bulletin	Mountain Home	1901	Daily	Carpenter Media Group	
Paragould Daily Press	Paragould		Daily	Paxton Media Group	
Pine Bluff Commercial	Pine Bluff		Daily	WEHCO Media	
The Courier	Russellville		Daily	Paxton Media Group	
The Daily Citizen	Searcy		Daily	Paxton Media Group	
Stuttgart Daily Leader	Stuttgart		Daily	GateHouse Media	
Texarkana Gazette	Texarkana		Daily	WEHCO Media	

== Weekly newspapers (currently published) ==
Title	Locale	Year est.	Frequency	Publisher/parent company	Notes
Little River Post	Ashdown	2020	Weekly	Journal Agency, LLC	
Atkins Chronicle	Atkins		Weekly		
The Johnson County Graphic	Clarksville	1877	Weekly		
Van Buren County Democrat	Clinton		Weekly	Paxton Media Group	
The Ashley News Observer	Crossett		Weekly		
Yell County Record	Danville		Weekly		
Dardanelle Post-Dispatch	Dardanelle		Weekly		
DeWitt Era Enterprise	DeWitt	1929	Weekly	DeWitt Publishing Company Inc	
Washington County Enterprise-Leader	Farmington		Weekly	Northwest Arkansas Newspapers LLC	
The Ashley County Ledger	Hamburg		Weekly		
The Sun-Times	Heber Springs		Weekly	Paxton Media Group	
The Helena World	Helena-West Helena	1871	Weekly	Helena World Chronicle, LLC	
Hot Springs Village Voice	Hot Springs Village	1990	Weekly	J. Allen, LLC	
The Chicot County Spectator/Eudora Enterprise	Lake Village		Weekly		
Arkansas Times	Little Rock		Weekly		
Petit Jean Country Headlight	Morrilton, Perryville		Weekly		
Newport Independent	Newport		Weekly	Paxton Media Group	
Times of Northeast Benton County	Pea Ridge		Weekly	WEHCO Media/ Stephens Media	
Siloam Springs Herald-Leader	Siloam Springs		Weekly		
Wynne Progress	Wynne	1904	Weekly		
Cross County Times	Wynne	1988			

== University newspapers ==
- The Arka Tech — Arkansas Tech University, Russellville
- The Arkansas Traveler — University of Arkansas, Fayetteville
- The Echo – University of Central Arkansas, Conway
- The Herald – Arkansas State University, Jonesboro
- The Oracle — Henderson State University, Arkadelphia
- The Bison — Harding University, Searcy

== Defunct ==
Title	Locale	Year est.	Ceased	Notes
Arkansas Advocate	Little Rock	1830	1837	
Arkansas Banner	Little Rock	1843	1845	Owned by the Democratic Party of Arkansas in 1945
Arkansas County Gazette	DeWitt	1884	1886	
Arkansas Democrat	DeWitt	1879	1882	
Arkansas Farmer	Little Rock	1844	1845	
Arkansas Forum	Siloam Springs	1921	c. 1921	
Arkansas Gazette	Arkansas Post, Little Rock	1819	1991	
Arkansas Herald	Siloam Springs	1882	1889	
Arkansas Intelligencer	Van Buren	1842	1845	
Arkansas Journal	Helena	1843	1845	
Arkansas Ladies Journal	Little Rock	1884	1886	founded by Mary W. Loughborough
Arkansas Post	DeWitt	1882	1882	
Arkansas Reporter	DeWitt	1885	1885?	
Arkansas State Democrat	Helena	1839	1841	Successor to the Helena Spy
Arkansas Star	Little Rock	1839	1841	
Arkansas Temperance Journal	Little Rock	1844	1845	
Arkansas Times and Advocate	Little Rock	1837	1844?	Combination of the Arkansas Weekly Times and Arkansas Advocate
Arkansas Traveler	Bentonville	1868	1869	
Arkansas Union	Siloam Springs	1890	1890	
Arkansas Weekly Times	Little Rock	1835	1837	Known as the Little Rock Times, 1835-1836
Ashley County Eagle	Hamburg	1889	1920	Successor to the El Dorado Eagle, merged with the Ashley County Leader
Ashley County Leader	Hamburg	1920	1969	Successor to the Hamburg Budget, merged with The Crossett News Observer
Batesville News	Batesville	1838	1843	Suspended in 1843, later revived as the North Arkansas
Benton County Gazette	Gravette	1908		
Benton County Journal	Bentonville	1886	1886	
Benton County Gazette	Gravette	1911	c. 1922	
Benton County Record	Bentonville	1916		
Benton County Sun	Bentonville	1890	1921	Merged into the Benton County Record
Bentonville Advance	Bentonville	1873	1883	Merged into The Bentonian
Bentonville Beacon	Bentonville	1866	1866	
Bentonville Cornerstone	Bentonville	1827	1827	
Bentonville Democrat	Bentonville	1859	1859	Successor to the Northwest Appeal
Bentonville Democrat	Bentonville	1869	1869	Successor to the Arkansas Traveler
Bentonville Democrat	Bentonville	1886		
Bentonville News	Bentonville	1905	1905	Merged into the Benton County Sun
Brinkley Argus	Brinkley		2007	Merged into Central Delta Argus-Sun
Bull Shoals Gazette	Cotter	1946	c. 1946	
Cabot Star-Herald	Cabot			
Carlisle Independent	Carlisle			
Central Delta Argus-Sun	Brinkley	2007	2016	Combination of Brinkley Argus and Monroe County Sun
Commercial Advertiser	Napoleon	1843	1844	
Constitution Journal	Helena	1836	1838	Successor to the Helena Herald
Cotter Courier	Cotter	1903	c. 1918	
The Cotter Record	Cotter	1911	1937	
Cross County Democrat	Wynne	1895	c. 1910	Merged into The Blade-Democrat
Cross County Democrat	Wynne	1912	1924	Successor to The Blade-Democrat
Cross County News	Wynne	1899	c. 1899	
Cross County Times	Parkin	1933	1987	Successor to the Parkin Times before becoming the Cross County Times
Democrat	DeWitt	1871	1871	
DeWitt Chronicle	DeWitt	1861	1862	
DeWitt Democrat	DeWitt	1898	1898	
DeWitt Enterprise	DeWitt	1871	1874	
DeWitt Enterprise	DeWitt	1916	1929	Merged into the DeWitt Era Enterprise
DeWitt Free Lance	DeWitt	1888	1888	
DeWitt New Era	DeWitt	1884	1929	Merged into the DeWitt Era Enterprise
DeWitt Republican	DeWitt	1880s	1880s	
Fayetteville Witness	Fayetteville	1840	1842	
Goldman Times	Goldman	1884	1885	
Gravette Democrat	Gravette			
Gravette Herald	Gravette			
Gravette News	Gravette			
Gravette News Herald	Gravette			Combination of the Gravette Herald and the Gravette News
Hamburg Budget	Hamburg	1912	1920	Renamed Ashley County Leader
Hamburg Monitor	Hamburg	1874	c. 1876	Founded as Hamburg Enterprise, renamed November 1874
Hamburg News	Hamburg	1884	1889	Successor to The Ashley County Times, merged into the Ashley County Eagle
Hamburg Reporter	Hamburg	1859	c. 1865	
Helena Herald	Helena	1833	1835	
Helena Spy	Helena	1838	1838	Successor to the Constitution Journal
Hope Star	Hope	1883	2018	
Independent Democrat	Little Rock	1843	1843	
Indicator	DeWitt	1875	1875?	
I.O.O.F. Beacon Light and Masonic Guide	Gravette	1914		Renamed Sovereign Odd Fellow before ending.
Life Line	Wynne	c. 1900	c. 1900	Black newspaper
Marvell Messenger	Marvell	1965	1980	
Monroe County Sun	Clarendon		2007	Merged into Central Delta Argus-Sun
Monte Ne Herald	Monte Ne	1903	1905	
The Morning News			2009	Merged with the Arkansas Democrat-Gazette's northwest operation
Mountain View Herald	Mountain View	1932	1953	Merged with the Stone County Leader
Napoleon Journal	Napoleon	1839	1840	Known as the Napoleon Messenger for two months in 1840 before cessation
Nevada County Picayune	Prescott		2018	
Norfork Enterprise	Norfork			
North Arkansas	Batesville	1843	1845	
North Arkansas Herald	Harrison	c. 1915		
North Arkansas Herald	Mountain Home	1890	c. 1891	
North Arkansas View	Mountain Home	1984	1994	
Northwest Appeal	Bentonville	1857	1858	
Ouachita Herald	Camden	1845	1845	
The Palladium	Monte Ne	1921		Quarterly special interest publication about bimetallism
Parkin Free Press	Parkin	1933	1934	Renamed Parkin Times for one month
Parkin Sentinel	Parkin	1911	c. 1911	
People's Friend	Rogers	c. 1910	1916	Socialist
Phillips County Progress	Helena	1984	2004	
Political Intelligencer	Little Rock	1834	1835	
The Pulaskian	Pulaski Heights	1915	1929	
Quid Nunc	Mountain Home	1877	1880	
Rogers Democrat	Rogers	1881		Founded as the Rogers New Era
Rogers Daily Post	Rogers	1910		
Rogers Enterprise	Rogers	1897	1897	
Rogers Journal	Rogers	c. 1900	1914	Known as the Rogers Advocate and Rogers Republican
Rogers Leader	Rogers	1896	1897	
Rogers Republican	Rogers	1883	1909	Merged into the Rogers Journal
Sentinel	DeWitt	1858	1859	Moved to Lake Village
Sentinel	DeWitt	1869	1871	
Sentry, De Witt	DeWitt	1884	1884	
Siloam Springs Advertiser	Siloam Springs	1918	c. 1918	
Siloam Springs Daily Register	Siloam Springs	1911		
Siloam Springs Free Press	Siloam Springs	1912		
Siloam Springs Globe	Siloam Springs	1881	1881	
Siloam Springs Herald-Democrat	Siloam Springs	1889		Combination of the Arkansas Herald and Siloam Springs Globe
Siloam Springs Hummer	Siloam Springs	1902	1902	
Siloam Springs Locomotive Herald	Siloam Springs	1880	1902	
Siloam Springs Sun	Siloam Springs	1880	1881	Briefly named Siloam Springs Dispatch before ending
Southern Shield	Helena	1840	1845	
Spirit of the Age	Little Rock	1845	1845	
Standard and Commercial Adviser	Napoleon	1841	1841	
Stuttgart Chronicle	Stuttgart	1880s	1906	Renamed The Arkansawyer
Stuttgart Free Press	Stuttgart	1889	c. 1921	
Stuttgart Germania	Stuttgart	1895		Published in German
Stuttgart Republican	Stuttgart	1915	1915	Restored 1920 and merged into The Arkansawyer
Stuttgart Star	Stuttgart	1890	1892	Known as the Republican Star in 1892 before cessation
Tax-Payers Bulletin	Siloam Springs	1921		Successor to the Arkansas Forum
Telegraph	Washington	1840	1845	Known as the Arkansas Telegraph at founding
The Arkansas Gleanor	DeWitt	1882	1883	
The Arkansas News	Mountain Home	1897		
The Arkansas Traveler	Wittsburg	c. 1853	c. 1854	
The Arkansawyer	Stuttgart	1906	1915	Successor to Stuttgart Chronicle
The Arkansawyer	Stuttgart	1920		Combination of The Stuttgart Booster and Stuttgart Republican
The Ashley County Times	Hamburg	1865	1873	
The Ashley County Times	Hamburg	1876	1884	Renamed Hamburg News
The Baxter County Citizen	Mountain Home	1880	1938	
The Bentonian	Bentonville	1873	1873	
The Bentonian	Bentonville	1883		Successor to The New Bentonville
The Blade-Democrat	Wynne	1910	1912	Combination of Cross County Democrat and The Blade Exchange
The Blade Exchange	Wynne	1900	c. 1910	Merged into The Blade-Democrat
The Chronicle	Wittsburg	1875	1877	
The Citizen-News	Mountain Home			
The Clarion	Hamburg	1901	c. 1901	
The Courier	Hamburg	1901	c. 1902	
The Crossett Home-News	Crossett	1949	1950	Merged into The Crossett News Observer
The Crossett News-Observer	Crossett	1950	1980	Renamed The Ashley News Observer
The Crossett Observer	Crossett	1906	c. 1940	Owned by the Crossett Lumber Co.
The Daily News	Mountain Home	1994	1999	Succeeded the North Arkansas View
The Daily Siftings Herald	Arkadelphia		2018	
The Elector	DeWitt	1866	1866	
The Epworth News	Wynne	1896	c. 1896	
The Harrison Daily Eclipse	Harrison	1901	1901	
The Gillett Reporter	Gillett	1914	1926	
The Grand Prairie News	Stuttgart	1916		
The Journal	Bentonville	1880		
The New Bentonville	Bentonville	1881		
The North Arkansas Herald	Mountain Home	1890		Monthly
The Ozark Clarion	Three Brothers	1912	c. 1912	
The Parkdale News	Parkdale	1900	c. 1900	
The Pilot	Wynne	1897	1899	Black newspaper
The Prairie Farmer	Goldman	1884	1884	
The Record	Gillett	1927	1936	
The Review	Stuttgart	1912	1912	
The Rogers Champion	Rogers	1881	1881	
The Screech Owl	Cotter	1921	1921	
The Southern Rising Wave of Temperance	Bentonville	1884		
The Spectator	Ozark	1911	2024	
The Stuttgart Booster	Stuttgart	1915	1920	Merged into The Arkansawyer
The Wheel Reporter	Stuttgart	1886	1886	
The White River Headlight	Cotter	1921	1922	Successor to Cotter Courier
The Wilmot Weekly	Wilmot	1912	c. 1914	Resumed in 1920
The Wynne Ripsaw	Wynne	1888	1891	Briefly renamed Wynne Gazette before ending
Twin City Tribune			1984	
Western Frontier Whig	Van Buren	1844	1845	
Wittsburg Gazette	Wittsburg	1871	1874	
Wittsburg Phoenix	Wittsburg	1875	1876	
Wittsburg Standard	Wittsburg	1875	1877	
Wynne Star	Wynne	c. 1924	1949	Successor to the Cross County Democrat, also known as the Wynne Daily Star-Progress and the Wynne Evening Star

== See also ==
- Arkansas media
  - List of radio stations in Arkansas
  - List of television stations in Arkansas
  - Media of cities in Arkansas: Fayetteville, Fort Smith, Hot Springs, Little Rock, Rogers
- Journalism:
  - Category:Journalists from Arkansas
  - University of Arkansas, Walter Lemke Department of Journalism in Fayetteville
- Arkansas literature
U.S. newspapers

Comprehensive

- Lists of newspapers
- List of newspapers in the United States

Frequency

- List of free daily newspapers in the United States
- List of weekly newspapers in the United States

Circulation

- List of international newspapers originating in the United States
- List of national newspapers in the United States
- List of newspapers in the United States by circulation
- List of newspapers serving cities over 100,000 in the United States

Foreign language

- List of French-language newspapers published in the United States
- List of German-language newspapers published in the United States
- List of Spanish-language newspapers published in the United States

Specialty

- List of African-American newspapers in the United States
- List of alternative weekly newspapers in the United States
- List of business newspapers in the United States
- List of family-owned newspapers in the United States
- List of Jewish newspapers in the United States
- List of LGBTQ periodicals in the United States
- List of student newspapers in the United States
- List of supermarket tabloids in the United States
- List of underground press in the United States

Other

- List of defunct newspapers of the United States

== Bibliography ==
- S. N. D. North; United States Department of the Interior (1884). "Catalogue of Periodical Publications: Arkansas". History and Present Condition of the Newspaper and Periodical Press of the United States. Washington, D.C.: Government Printing Office. OCLC 1850475.
- James T. Haley, ed. (1895), "Newspapers: Arkansas", Afro-American Encyclopaedia, Nashville: Haley & Florida, hdl:2027/inu.30000029292855, OCLC 219597043
- "Arkansas". American Newspaper Directory. New York: George P. Rowell. 1900. hdl:2027/umn.31951002273861a.
- Josiah H. Shinn (1906), "Early Arkansas Newspapers", Publications of the Arkansas Historical Association, Fayetteville, pp. 395–403
- Allsopp, Frederick W. (1922). History of the Arkansas Press for a Hundred Years and More (PDF) (Reprint ed.). Little Rock, Ark: Parke-Harper Pub. Co. ISBN 9780893080730. OCLC 3576168 – via Southern Historical Press.
- "Arkansas". American Newspaper Annual & Directory. Philadelphia: N. W. Ayer & Son. 1922. pp. 55+. hdl:2027/umn.31951001295695n.
- Federal Writers' Project (1941), "Newspapers and Radio", Arkansas: a Guide to the State, American Guide Series, New York, pp. 93–96, hdl:2027/mdp.39015002678947, OCLC 478887 – via HathiTrust
- Works Progress Administration (1942). Union list of Arkansas newspapers, 1819-1942. Little Rock – via HathiTrust.
- John A. Hudson and Robert L. Peterson (1955). "Arkansas Newspapers in the University of Texas Newspaper Collection". Arkansas Historical Quarterly. 14 (3): 207–224. doi:10.2307/40037988. JSTOR 40037988.
- G. Thomas Tanselle (1971). "General Studies: Arkansas". Guide to the Study of United States Imprints. Harvard University Press. p. 832. ISBN 978-0-674-36761-6. (Includes information about newspapers)
- Meriwether, Robert W. (1974). A Chronicle of Arkansas Newspapers Published Since 1922 and of the Arkansas Press Association, 1930-1972. Little Rock, Ark: Arkansas Press Association. OCLC 2146483.
- Michael B. Dougan (2003). Community diaries: Arkansas newspapering, 1819-2002. August House. ISBN 0874837227.
