= Catharine Lumby =

Australian academic

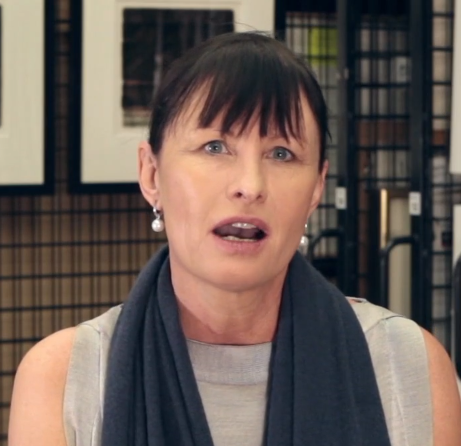
- Lumby in 2013
- Occupations: Media studies academic, journalist

Academic background
- Education: Macquarie University
- Thesis: Life in a Tabloid World : an analysis of key shifts in Australian and US print and television media (1999)

Academic work
- Institutions: University of New South Wales; Macquarie University; University of Sydney

Catharine Lumby is an Australian academic, author and journalist, currently Chair of the Department of Media and Communication at University of Sydney.

== Career ==
Prior to her move to academia, Lumby was a feature writer and columnist for The Sydney Morning Herald, a news writer for the Australian Broadcasting Corporation and a columnist and senior writer at The Bulletin. She holds a BA LLB from the University of Sydney and was awarded a PhD by Macquarie University for her thesis "Life in a tabloid world: an analysis of key shifts in Australian and US print and television media".

Lumby was the foundation Chair of the Media and Communications Department at the University of Sydney (1999–2007) and the foundation Director of the Journalism and Media Research Centre at the University of New South Wales (2008–2013). She was Professor of Media at Macquarie University (2013–2021), returning to the University of Sydney as Professor of Media Studies in 2021.

Since 2004 she has been a pro bono gender adviser to the National Rugby League (NRL). In 2017 she almost resigned from the role, stating that she was disappointed by the lack of off-field behaviour change of NRL players towards women and that it highlighted continued disrespect.

In 2013 Lumby was appointed by Tony Burke, Minister for the Arts, to the Council of the National Museum of Australia. She was re-appointed for a further three-year term in May 2016.

Lumby wrote the foreword to End Rape on Campus Australia's report, Connecting the dots: Understanding sexual assault in university communities, submitted to the Australian Human Rights Commission in January 2017.

Lumby is a contributor to The Guardian on gender issues. She is a Member of the Editorial Boards of the International Journal of Cultural Studies and the Feminist Media Studies journal.

== Publications ==
=== As author ===
- Bad Girls: The Media, Sex and Feminism in the 90s, Allen & Unwin, 1997, ISBN 1864480769
- Gotcha: Life in a Tabloid World, Allen & Unwin, 1999, ISBN 186508073X
- Tim Storrier: The Art of the Outsider, Craftman's House, 2000, ISBN 905703042X
- Why TV Is Good for Kids: Raising 21st Century Children, co-authored with Duncan Fine, Pan Macmillan, 2006, ISBN 9781405037242
- The Porn Report, co-authored with Alan McKee and Kath Albury, Melbourne University Press, 2008, ISBN 9780522853407
- Alvin Purple, about the 1973 comedy film, Alvin Purple, for the Australian Screen Classic Series, Currency Press, 2008, ISBN 9780868198446
- Broken: Children, Parents and Family Courts, co-authored with Camilla Nelson, 2021, Black Inc., ISBN 9781760643058
- Feeling Terrified? The Emotions of Online Violent Extremism, co-authored with Lise Waldek and Julian Droogan, Cambridge University Press, 2021, ISBN 9781108814232
- Frank Moorhouse: A Life, Allen & Unwin, 2023, ISBN 9781742372242

=== As editor ===
- Remote Control: New Media, New Ethics, co-edited with Elspeth Probyn, Cambridge University Press, 2003, ISBN 9780511187100
- The Age of Consent: Young People, Sexual Abuse and Agency, co-edited with Kate Gleeson, UWA Publishing, 2019, ISBN 9781760800314

=== As contributor ===
Lumby has contributed chapters to a number of books, including:

- "Generation Panics: Age, Knowledge and Cultural Power in a New Media Era", in Culture in Australia : Policies, Publics and Programs, edited by Tony Bennett and David Carter, Cambridge University Press, Melbourne, 2001, ISBN 9780521004039
- "The President's Penis : Entertaining Sex and Power", in Our Monica, Ourselves : The Clinton Affair and the National Interest, edited by Lauren Berlant and Lisa Duggan, New York University Press, 2001, ISBN 9780814739280
- "Inside Out: Journalism in the University, Intellectuals in the Media", in Consent and Consensus : Politics, Media and Governance in Twentieth Century Australia, edited by Denis Cryle and Jean Hillier, Australia Research Institute, 2005, ISBN 1920845127
- "Media Ethics", in The Media and Communications in Australia, edited by Stuart Cunningham and Graeme Turner, Allen & Unwin, 2006, ISBN 1741148227
- "Past the Post in Feminist Media Studies", in Current Perspectives in Feminist Media Studies, edited by Lisa McLaughlin and Cynthia Carter, Routledge, 2013, ISBN 9780415540117
- "Policing The Crisis Of Masculinity: Media And Masculinity At The Dawn Of The New Century", in The Routledge Companion to Media and Gender, edited by Cynthia Carter, Linda Steiner and Lisa McLaughlin, Routledge, Taylor & Francis Group, 2015, ISBN 9781138849129

== Awards and honours ==
- Harkness Fellowship, The Commonwealth Fund, New York, 1994–96
- Presented the 2004 Dymphna Clark Memorial Lecture
- Vice Chancellor's Senior Leadership Award, University of New South Wales, 2012
