= Margaret Gallagher =

Irish freelance researcher and writer

- Born: Ireland

Academic background
- Education: Western Michigan University
- Thesis: The development and pilot operation of an assessment center with implications for the selection of school principals (1978)

Academic work
- Institutions: Various (freelance researcher and writer)
- Main interests: Gender and media
External videos
- WACC talks
- Margaret Gallagher: Why gender and media justice matter via Vimeo
- Website: Mapping Global Media Policy

Margaret Gallagher is an Irish freelance researcher and writer specialising in gender and media. She has carried out research, development and evaluation projects for the United Nations Statistics Division, UNIFEM, UNESCO, the International Labour Office, the Council of Europe, the European Commission and the European Audiovisual Observatory.

Gallagher sits on the editorial boards of International Communication Gazette, Feminist Media Studies and, Communication for Development and Social Change.

== Education ==
Gallagher gained a M.Sc. in education from the University of Dayton in 1972, and her Ed.D. in 1978 from Western Michigan University.

== Career ==
Gallagher began her career, in the 1970s, researching the use of technology in education, eventually becoming deputy head of the Audiovisual Media Research Group at the Open University. She moved into gender and media research, including participation rates and portrayal of women in the media, in the early 1980s.

In 1986 Gallagher established the European Commission's Steering Committee for Equal Opportunities in Broadcasting, which she coordinated until 1990. From 1989 to 1999 she worked on the "Prix Niki", the European Commission's biennial television prize for innovative portrayal of women and men. She has also acted as a consultant to a consortium of five European broadcasters for the development of an audiovisual training kit Screening Gender (1997-2000), and to the World Association for Christian Communication (WAAC) for the second Global Media Monitoring Project (GMMP) (2000).

In 2001, Gallagher became an associate of the Women's Institute for Freedom of the Press (WIFP).

Gallagher is currently Key Expert on Media Monitoring for the European Neighbourhood Barometer project "Opinion Polling and Media Monitoring" (EuropeAid, European Commission).

== Bibliography ==
=== Books ===
- Gallagher, Margaret (1972). The value of play and its implications for education in the development of the whole person (M.Sc. thesis). University of Dayton. OCLC 8200672.
- Gallagher, Margaret; OU Mass Communication and Society Course Team (1977). Media organizations. Milton Keynes: Open University. OCLC 154157252. Social sciences: Mass communication and society course DE353, units 10–12.
- Gallagher, Margaret; Murdock, Graham (1977). Patterns of ownership: questions of control. Milton Keynes: Open University. OCLC 218514234. Social sciences: Mass communication and society course DE353, units 10–12.
- Gallagher, Margaret (1978). The development and pilot operation of an assessment center with implications for the selection of school principals (Ed.D. thesis). Western Michigan University. OCLC 4584178. ProQuest.
- Gallagher, Margaret; Bates, Tony (1978). Formative evaluation of educational television programmes: the outcome of a seminar held by the Council for Educational Technology in March 1978. London: Council for Educational Technology. ISBN 9780902204898.
- Gallagher, Margaret (1978). The development and pilot operation of an assessment center with implications for the selection of school principals (Ed.D. thesis). Western Michigan University. OCLC 4584178. ProQuest.
- Gallagher, Margaret; Santiago, Lilia Quindoza (1994). Women empowering communication: a resource book on women and the globalization of media. London / Manila / New York: WACC London / Isis International / International Women's Tribune Center. ISBN 9789719140009.
- Gallagher, Margaret (2001). Gender setting: new media agendas for monitoring and advocacy. London New York: Zed Books in association with WACC London. ISBN 9781856498456. Preview.
- Gallagher, Margaret (2005). Who makes the news? Global media monitoring project (GMMP) 2005. South Africa: World Association for Christian Communication. OCLC 488261820. Pdf.
- Gallagher, Margaret (2010). Who makes the news? Global media monitoring project (GMMP) 2010. South Africa: World Association for Christian Communication. OCLC 833313633. Archived from the original on 18 June 2017. Pdf.

=== Chapters in books ===
- Gallagher, Margaret (2000), "The news that shaped the numbers: global media monitoring project 2000", in Spears, George; Seydegart, Kasia (eds.), Who makes the news? Global media monitoring project (GMMP) 2000, London: World Association for Christian Communication, pp. 46–70, OCLC 50214413 Pdf.
- Gallagher, Margaret (2003), "Feminist media perspectives", in Valdivia, Angharad N. (ed.), A companion to media studies, Malden, Massachusetts: Blackwell Publishing, pp. 19–39, ISBN 9780470999066.

Also available at: Gallagher, Margaret (December 2007). "Feminist Media Perspectives". A Companion to Media Studies. Wiley. pp. 19–39. doi:10.1002/9780470999066.ch2. ISBN 9780470999066. S2CID 51784716.

- Gallagher, Margaret (2004), "The impact of monitoring media images of women", in Carter, Cynthia; Steiner, Linda (eds.), Critical readings: media and gender, Maidenhead: Open University Press, pp. 148–161, ISBN 9780335210985.
- Gallagher, Margaret (2008), "Feminist issues and the global media system", in Sarikakis, Katharine; Leslie Regan, Shade (eds.), Feminist interventions in international communication: minding the gap, Lanham, Maryland: Rowman & Littlefield, pp. 17–32, ISBN 9780742553057.
- Gallagher, Margaret (2011), "Feminism and social justice: challenging the media rhetoric", in Curry Jansen, Sue; Pooley, Jefferson; Taub-Pervizpour, Lora (eds.), Media and social justice, New York: Palgrave Macmillan, pp. 131–144, ISBN 9780230108639.
- Gallagher, Margaret (2011), "Gender and communication policy: struggling for space", in Mansell, Robin; Raboy, Marc (eds.), The handbook of global media and communication policy, Malden, Massachusetts: Wiley-Blackwell, pp. 449–466, ISBN 9781405198714.
- Gallagher, Margaret (2014), "Reframing communication rights: why gender matters", in Padovani, Claudia; Calabrese, Andrew (eds.), Communication rights and social justice: historical accounts of transnational mobilizations, Houndmills, Basingstoke, Hampshire New York: Palgrave Macmillan, pp. 234–248, ISBN 9781137378293.
- Gallagher, Margaret (2015), "Media and the representation of gender", in Carter, Cynthia; Steiner, Linda; McLaughlin, Lisa (eds.), The Routledge companion to media & gender, London New York: Routledge, pp. 23–31, ISBN 9781138849129.

=== Journal articles ===
- Gallagher, Margaret; Marshall, John (October 1975). "Broadcasting and the need for replay facilities at the Open University". British Journal of Educational Technology. 6 (3): 35–45. doi:10.1111/j.1467-8535.1975.tb00177.x.
- Gallagher, Margaret; Bates, Tony (January 1976). "The development of research in broadcasting at the Open University". British Journal of Educational Technology. 7 (1): 31–43. doi:10.1111/j.1467-8535.1976.tb00186.x.
- Gallagher, Margaret (March 1977). "Programme evaluation methods at the Open University". Journal of Educational Television. 3 (1): 23–26. doi:10.1080/1358165770030108.
- Gallagher, Margaret (December 1978). "Good television and good teaching: some tensions in educational practice". Educational Broadcasting International. 11 (4). ERIC: 203–206. OCLC 425834600.
- Gallagher, Margaret (December 1979). "Women and the mass media: industrialization and development". Educational Broadcasting International. 12 (4). ERIC: 148–152. OCLC 425675111.
- Gallagher, Margaret (September 1982). "The best use of educational TV". Media in Education and Development. 15 (3). British Council: 132–137. OCLC 424887354.
- Gallagher, Margaret; Street, Christine (December 1983). "Unequal opportunities (interview with Margaret Gallagher)". Media in Education and Development. 16 (4). British Council: 172–175. OCLC 425568538.
- Gallagher, Margaret (August 1986). "Myth and reality in women's employment in broadcasting ten years of equal opportunity". MedieKultur: Journal of Media and Communication Research. 2 (4). Society of Media researchers In Denmark (SMID): 196–219. doi:10.7146/mediekultur.v2i4.746. Pdf. Report from the Copenhagen Conference on Women and Electronic Mass Media.
- Gallagher, Margaret (March 1990). "Shifting focus: women and broadcasting in the European Community". Studies of Broadcasting. 26: 61–82. doi:10.1080/1358165770030108. OCLC 832772783.
- Gallagher, Margaret (January 2001). "The push and pull of action and research in feminist media studies". Feminist Media Studies. 1 (1): 11–15. doi:10.1080/14680770120042774. S2CID 144620346.
- Gallagher, Margaret (Winter 2001). "Reporting on gender in journalism: 'Why do so few women reach the top?'". Nieman Reports. 55 (4). Nieman Foundation for Journalism, Harvard University: 63.
- Gallagher, Margaret (2005). "Beijing's legacy for gender and media". Media Development. World Association for Christian Communication: 3. OCLC 99127408.
- Gallagher, Margaret (2010). "Women's human and communication rights". Media Development. World Association for Christian Communication: 3. OCLC 528874773.
- Gallagher, Margaret (2010). "Feminist scholarship in communication". Media Development. 57 (4). World Association for Christian Communication: 6. OCLC 689757826. Archived from the original on 4 July 2017.

=== Papers ===
UNESCO / UN

- Gallagher, Margaret (December 1979). The portrayal and participation of women in the media. Paris: UNESCO. OCLC 27436047. Pdf.
- Gallagher, Margaret (1980). The image reflected by mass media: stereotypes: images of women in the mass media. New York: UNESCO. OCLC 23071662. Pdf. Discussion document for the International Commission for the Study of Communication (established by UNESCO) in application of Resolution 100 adopted by the General Conference of UNESCO at its 19th session.
- Gallagher, Margaret (April 1980). Women in the communications media: some aspects of their portrayal and participation. New York: United Nations. OCLC 81493618.
- Gallagher, Margaret (1981). Unequal opportunities: the case of women and the media. Paris: UNESCO. ISBN 9789231018978. Pdf.
- Gallagher, Margaret (1982). Cultural industries: a challenge for the future of culture. Paris: UNESCO. ISBN 9789231020032. Pdf.
- Gallagher, Margaret (1985). Becoming aware: human rights and the family: a study based on four communication campaigns. Paris: UNESCO. ISBN 9789231021787. Pdf.
- Gallagher, Margaret (1987). Women and media decision-making: the invisible barriers. Paris: UNESCO. ISBN 9789231025051. OCLC 18006909. Pdf.
- Gallagher, Margaret (1995). An unfinished story: gender patterns in media employment. My von Euler (contributor). Paris: UNESCO. ISBN 9789231032080. Pdf. (Reports and papers on mass communication, no 110.)
- Gallagher, Margaret (1995). Women and the media. Springer series, focus on women. New York: Department of Public Information, United Nations. OCLC 81652501.
- Gallagher, Margaret (2000). From Mexico to Beijing and beyond: covering women in the world's news. Mass media and women series. New York: UNIFEM. OCLC 225206975.

Open University

- Gallagher, Margaret (1974). Evaluation of CT4 1973 pilot scheme. Walton, Milton Keynes: Open University. (IET paper on broadcasting no. 23.)
- Gallagher, Margaret; Marshall, John (1974). Video cassette recorder project. Walton, Milton Keynes: Open University. (IET paper on broadcasting no. 35.)
- Gallagher, Margaret; Marshall, John (1975). Cassette-replay system for students. Walton, Milton Keynes: Open University. (IET paper on broadcasting no 40.)
- Gallagher, Margaret (January 1975). Broadcast evaluation report number two: Cumbria case study, E221: TV3 R6. Walton, Milton Keynes: Open University. OCLC 424965548. Pdf. (Audio-Visual Media Research Group.)
- Gallagher, Margaret; Marshall, John (February 1975). Broadcasting and the need for replay facilities at the Open University. Walton, Milton Keynes: Open University. OCLC 911447049. Pdf. (IET paper on broadcasting no 41.)
- Gallagher, Margaret (April 1975). Broadcast evaluation report number four: industrial chemistry component 524: TV7 R3. Walton, Milton Keynes: Open University. OCLC 911447317. Pdf. (Audio-Visual Media Research Group.)
- Gallagher, Margaret (July 1975). Broadcast evaluation report number eight: decision-making in British education systems "caught in the net", E221: R15. Walton, Milton Keynes: Open University. OCLC 911447318. Pdf. (Audio-Visual Media Research Group.)
- Gallagher, Margaret (August 1975). Broadcast evaluation report number one: analysis M231. Walton, Milton Keynes: Open University. OCLC 424965558. Pdf. (Audio-Visual Media Research Group with Faculty of Mathematics.)
- Gallagher, Margaret (1976). Report on the VCR steering group on audio visual replay provision to students. Walton, Milton Keynes: Open University. (IET paper on broadcasting no 55.)
- Gallagher, Margaret (1976). Programme evaluation methods at the Open University. Walton, Milton Keynes: Open University. (IET paper on broadcasting no 59.)
- Gallagher, Margaret (1976). Preliminary report on 50-minute TV programmes. Walton, Milton Keynes: Open University. (IET paper on broadcasting no 62.)
- Gallagher, Margaret; Marshall, John (1976). Audio replay provision to students. Walton, Milton Keynes: Open University. (IET paper on broadcasting no 63.)
- Gallagher, Margaret; Bates, Tony (1977). Improving the effectiveness of Open University television case-studies and documentaries. Walton, Milton Keynes: Open University. OCLC 427022374. (IET paper on broadcasting no 77.)
- Gallagher, Margaret (1977). Broadcasting and the Open University student. Walton, Milton Keynes: Open University. (IET paper on broadcasting no 80.)
- Gallagher, Margaret (1977). Using broadcasts in the social sciences. Walton, Milton Keynes: Open University. (IET paper on broadcasting no 86.)
- Gallagher, Margaret (1977). Workshop on communication planning, Peanang, Malaysia, November 1977: issues arising from the evaluation. Walton, Milton Keynes: Open University. (IET paper on broadcasting no 96.)
- Gallagher, Margaret (April 1978). Audio visual media for teaching and training: the contribution of research. Walton, Milton Keynes: Open University. OCLC 911488693. (IET paper on broadcasting no 88.)
- Gallagher, Margaret (1978). Good television and teaching and training: some tensions in educational practice. Walton, Milton Keynes: Open University. (IET paper on broadcasting no 91.)
- Gallagher, Margaret; Bates, Tony (December 1978). Try it first?: Formative evaluation of educational television programmes: three British case studies. Walton, Milton Keynes: Open University. ISBN 9780902204898. Seminar and conference reports (Council for Educational Technology for the United Kingdom), 3. (IET paper on broadcasting no 100.)
- Gallagher, Margaret (1979). Preliminary report on student reaction to economics television programmes. Walton, Milton Keynes: Open University. (IET paper on broadcasting no 102.)
- Gallagher, Margaret (1979). Organisation and evaluation of the VCR pilot project of the Educational Media Service Malaysia: report on consultative visit, 20th September 1979 - 13th October 1979 under the auspices of the British Council. Walton, Milton Keynes: Open University. (IET paper on broadcasting no 127.)
- Gallagher, Margaret (1982). Broadcast evaluation: what it can tell us that we don't know already?. Walton, Milton Keynes: Open University. (IET paper on broadcasting no. 42.)

Europe

- Gallagher, Margaret (1984). Employment and positive action for women in the television organizations of the EEC member states. Brussels: Commission of the European Communities. OCLC 320837470.
- Gallagher, Margaret (September 1988). Women and television in Europe. Supplement ... to Women of Europe (series), no. 28. Brussels: Women's Information Service, Commission of the European Communities. OCLC 21918568.
- Gallagher, Margaret (1994). Workshop: women and the mass media. Toledo: EU. OCLC 320872167.
- Gallagher, Margaret (1999). "France, Ireland and the United Kingdom". Images of women in the media: report on existing research in the European Union. Luxembourg Lanham, Maryland: Office for Official Publications of the European Communities Bernan Associates distributor. ISBN 9789282856758. (Paper ref CE-10-97-122-EN-C) Free pdf of entire paper.
- Gallagher, Margaret (1998). Employment patterns in European broadcasting: prospects for equality. Brussels: European Commission, Directorate-General V: Employment, Industrial Relations and Social Affairs, Equal Opportunities Unit. OCLC 847113137.

Other

- Gallagher, Margaret (1982). Television content and gender: what it portrays and how it is perceived. London: City University London. OCLC 320813704. Paper presented at the Conference of the International Association of Mass Communication Researchers, Paris, 6–10 September 1982.
- Gallagher, Margaret (1984). Communication, control and the problem of gender. London: City University London. OCLC 320845034. Paper presented to the 1st plenary session of the 1984 conference.
- Gallagher, Margaret (May 1985). Feminism, communication and the politics of knowledge. Honolulu: ERIC. OCLC 425506084. Paper presented at the annual meeting of the International Communication Association, Honolulu.
- Gallagher, Margaret (29–31 May 2007). Reporting the political world through a gender lens. 4th Asia Media Summit (AMS). Kuala Lumpur. OCLC 849299027.
