= Institute for Responsible Citizenship =

American non-profit organization

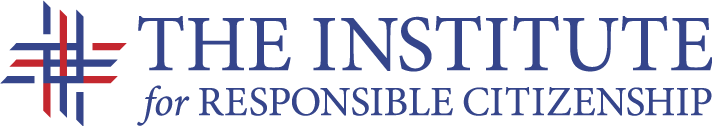
- Abbreviation: The Institute
- Formation: 2003
- Type: Not-for-Profit
- Location: Washington, D.C.
- President: William A. Keyes, IV
- Website: theinstitute.net

The Institute for Responsible Citizenship is a leadership program for college students. Its mission is to prepare citizens and leaders.

== History ==
The Institute for Responsible Citizenship was founded in 2003 by William A. Keyes, IV. Recipient of the 2010 Mac A. Stewart Distinguished Award for Service presented by Ohio State University, Keyes has previously worked in the legislative and executive branches of the U.S. Federal Government and public affairs consulting. Keyes received a degree from the School of Journalism and Mass Communication at the University of North Carolina (UNC). He has served as a senior policy advisor at the White House and a member of Board of Visitors and later part of the Board of Trustees at UNC.

== Programs ==
The Institute was founded on five core beliefs:

- Individuals with the greatest potential should be challenged to pursue the highest achievement.
- Individuals who work hard to achieve academic success should be recognized and rewarded.
- Individuals who are destined for leadership should understand fundamental economic and constitutional principles.
- Individuals who strive to make a difference can have a greater impact by working together.
- Individuals of character should be encouraged to pursue success as a platform for service to their communities, our nation, and the world.

From hundreds of applications, the Institute selects some of the nation's best and brightest college students to participate in an intensive two-summer program. It includes:

- High-level internships in their fields of interest
- Seminars on Ethics & on Economic and Constitutional Principles
- Comprehensive leadership seminars
- Private briefings with some of the nation's most prominent public and private sector leaders

The Institute supplements these activities with extensive support from the Institute's alumni, staff, and friends. The Institute emphasizes the fact that scholars become a part of a genuine network that will continue to support them throughout their lives.

== Alumni ==
Since 2003, the Institute has grown to serve more than 300 scholars and alumni across the country. They have a wide variety of interests and represent small liberal arts colleges, large universities, Ivy League institutions, and historically Black college and universities. Alumni have been accepted to all of the nation's top law schools and many of the nation's leading graduate programs.

Alumni of the program include six Rhodes Scholars, numerous Truman Scholars, and other successful professionals working in the legal, business, education, non-profit and artistic sectors.
