= Walter E. Hussman Jr. =

American journalist and publisher (born 1947)

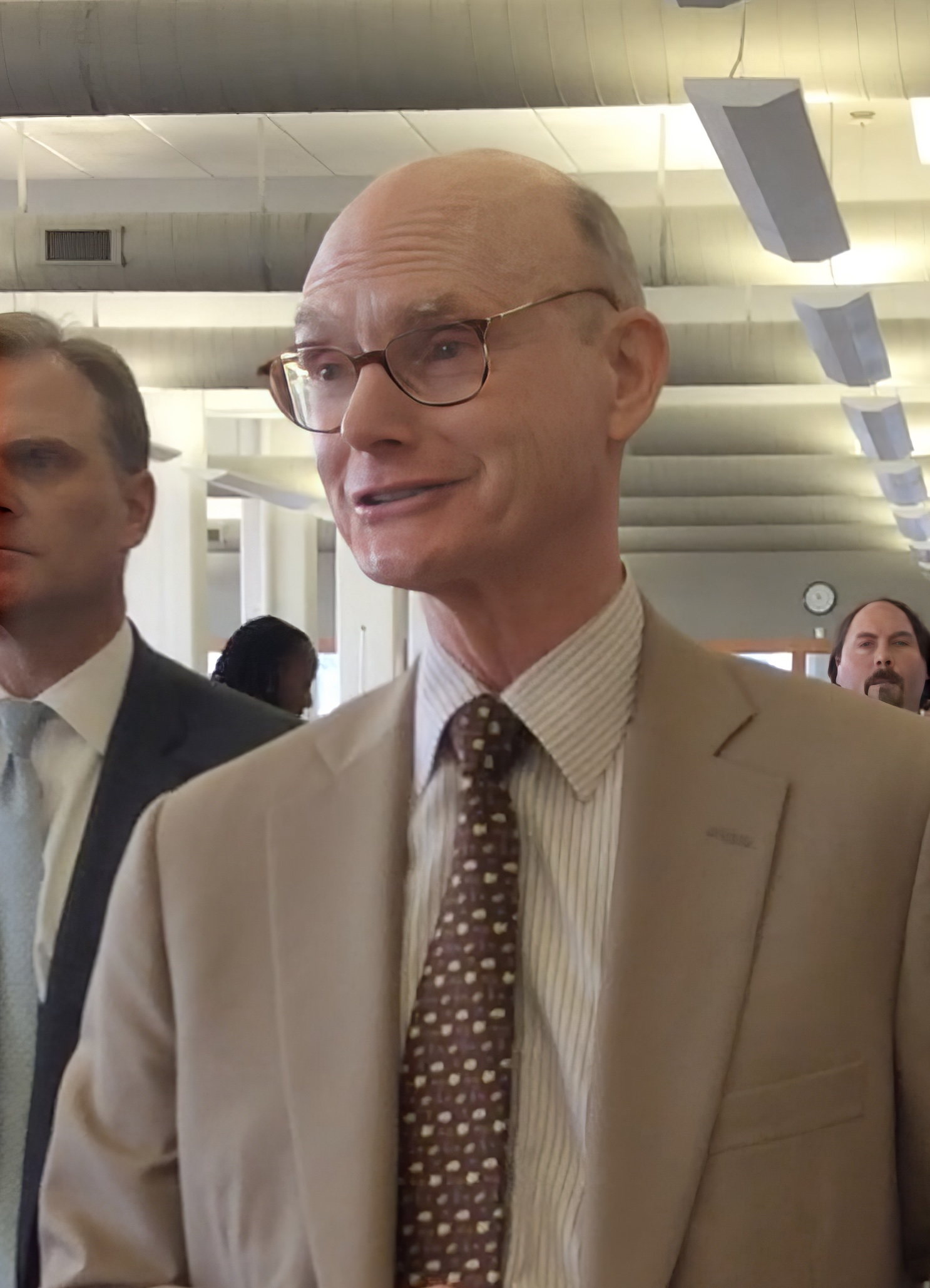
- Born: Walter Edward Hussman Jr. January 5, 1947 (age 79); Texarkana, Arkansas, U.S.
- Education: University of North Carolina Chapel Hill, UNC Hussman School of Journalism and Media. Columbia University
- Occupation: Chairman of WEHCO Media
- Spouse: Robena Kendrick Hussman
- Children: 3
- Parents: Walter E. Hussman Sr. (father); Betty Palmer Hussman (mother)

Walter Edward Hussman Jr. (born January 5, 1947), is an American newspaper publisher and chairman of WEHCO Media, Inc. He is the publisher of the Arkansas Democrat-Gazette in Little Rock, which is the largest newspaper in Arkansas. Hussman directs a chain of smaller newspapers, including the Chattanooga Times Free Press and the Texarkana Gazette, and owns cable television companies in four states.

== Early years and education ==
Hussman was born in Texarkana, Arkansas, but moved in 1949 to Camden, Arkansas, with his parents, Walter E. Hussman Sr. (1906–1988) and the former Betty Palmer (1911–1990), and two older sisters. Hussman Sr. published The Camden News, which he had purchased from his father-in-law, Clyde E. Palmer (1876–1957).

Hussman graduated from the Lawrenceville School in 1964. He earned his bachelor's degree in journalism at the University of North Carolina School of Journalism and his master's of business administration from Columbia University. In 1970, Hussman worked as a reporter for Forbes magazine. Later he became his father's administrative assistant, then general manager of The Camden News. He moved to Hot Springs in 1973 to become vice president and general manager of the Palmer Newspapers, which became a division of WEHCO Media.

In 1974, Hussman left Hot Springs for Little Rock when WEHCO purchased the Arkansas Democrat and he was named publisher.

== Newspaper work ==
Hussman moved the Arkansas Democrat to a morning paper in 1979 and began using color in 1982. He fought a newspaper "war" with the competing Arkansas Gazette. The two papers merged into the joint Arkansas Democrat-Gazette in October 1991. Hussman was opposed to newspapers providing free content online, writing in a 2007 Wall Street Journal op-ed column that newspapers should stop providing such free content, calling the posting of so much of the newspaper product a "self-inflicted wound." He implemented a shift from delivering newspapers in print to delivering them on iPads in 2018.

Hussman is a former chairman of the Southern Newspaper Publishers Association (SNPA) and was the first recipient of SNPA's Frank W. Mayborn award, given in honor of the late publisher of the Temple Daily Telegram in Temple, Texas.

=== Awards and honors ===
- In 2008, Hussman was named Publisher of the Year by Editor & Publisher, a trade publication.
- In 2012, Hussman was inducted in the Arkansas Business Hall of Fame.
- In 2014, Hussman was inducted into the NC Media and Journalism Hall of Fame.

=== Hussman School of Journalism & Media at UNC ===
In 2019, Hussman made a $25 million donation to the UNC School of Media and Journalism, which was renamed in his honor. He praised the school in an op-ed published in The Wall Street Journal, writing that "Journalism schools need to adopt similar statement of core journalistic values."

== Controversies ==
Hussman raised concerns with University of North Carolina-Chapel Hill leadership about hiring Nikole Hannah-Jones, a Black journalist who developed The 1619 Project. After its initial delay in voting on her tenure, on June 30, 2021, the UNC board of trustees voted to grant tenure to Hannah-Jones. Hannah-Jones subsequently announced she would join the faculty of Howard University as the inaugural Knight Chair in Race and Reporting, having secured $15 million for the institution from foundations.

== Personal life ==
Hussman lives in Little Rock with his wife, the former Robena Kendrick (b. June 26, 1946). They have three children.
