= Linda Steiner =

American professor and journalist

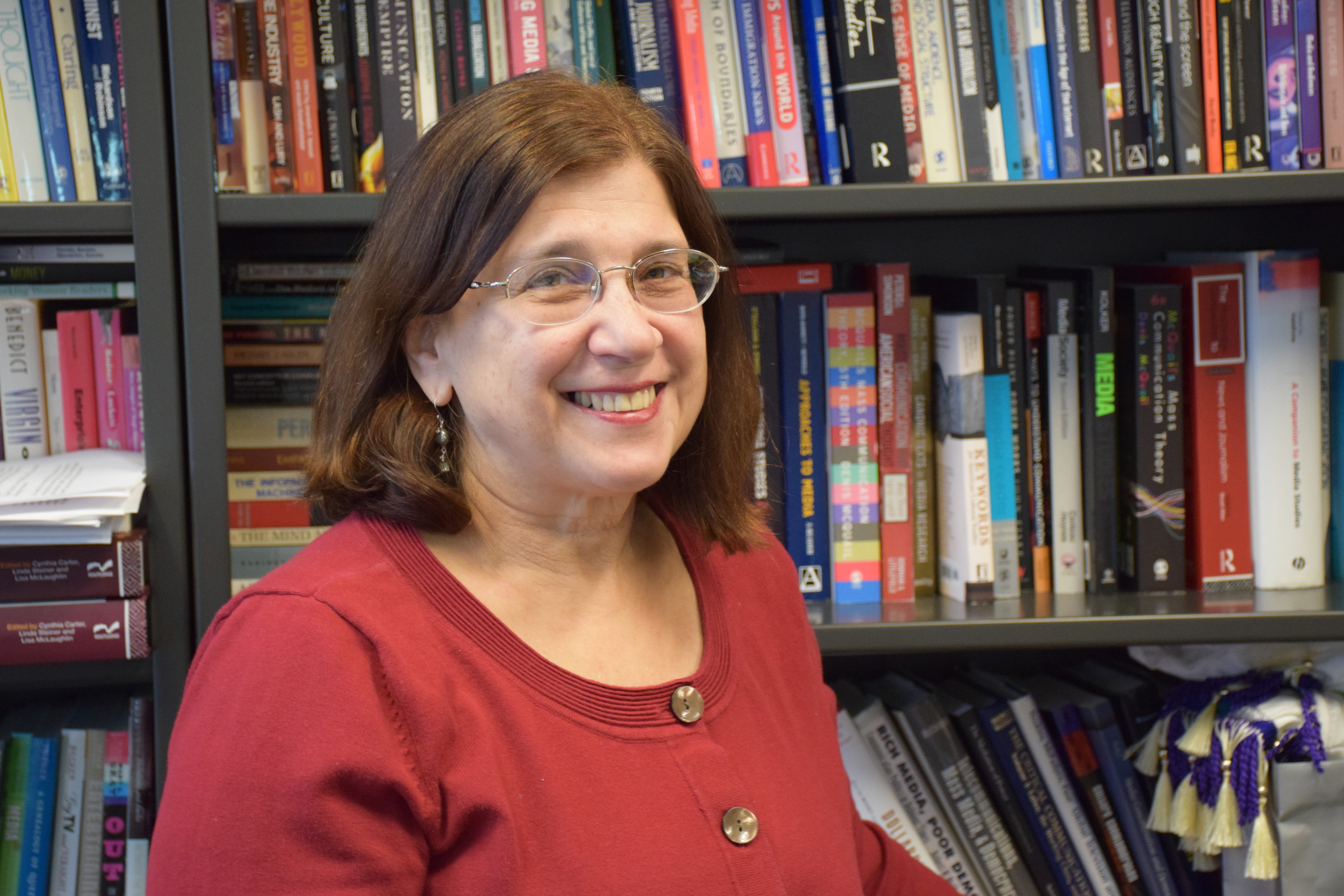
- Born: Linda Claire Steiner; January 3, 1950 (age 76)
- Occupations: Educator, academic

Academic background
- Education: University of Illinois at Urbana–Champaign

Linda Claire Steiner (born January 3, 1950) is a professor at Philip Merrill College of Journalism, University of Maryland. She is also the editor-in-chief of the journal Journalism & Communication Monographs, and sits on the editorial board of Critical Studies in Media Communication.

== Biography ==
Steiner earned her degree from Smith College, and her Ph.D. (1979) from University of Illinois at Urbana–Champaign. Her 1979 doctoral thesis, The women's suffrage press, 1850-1900: a cultural analysis can be found here.

Steiner was previously professor and department chair at Rutgers University. She was also the president of the Association for Education in Journalism and Mass Communication 2011-2012.

== Awards ==
- 2012 Outstanding Woman of the Year in Journalism and Mass Communication Education.

== Bibliography ==
=== Books ===
- Steiner, Linda (1979). The women's suffrage press, 1850-1900: a cultural analysis (Ph.D. thesis). University of Illinois at Urbana–Champaign. OCLC 6416880.
- Steiner, Linda; Chambers, Deborah; Fleming, Carole (2004). Women and journalism. London New York: Routledge. ISBN 9780203500668.
- Steiner, Linda; Carter, Cynthia (2004). Critical readings: media and gender. Maidenhead: Open University Press. ISBN 978-0335210985.
- Steiner, Linda; Carter, Cynthia; McLaughlin, Lisa (2015). The Routledge companion to media & gender. London New York: Routledge. ISBN 9781138849129.
- Steiner, Linda; Eckert, Stine (2025). We Can Do Better, Feminist Manifestos for Media and Communication. New Brunswick New Jersey: Rutgers University Press. ISBN 9781978838178.

=== Chapters in books ===
- Steiner, Linda; Eckert, Stine (2013), "Wikipedia's gender gap", in Armstrong, Cory L. (ed.), Media disparity: a gender battleground, Lanham, Maryland: Lexington Books, pp. 87–98, ISBN 9780739181874.
- Steiner, Linda (2014), "Sandra Harding: the less false accounts of feminist standpoint epistemology", in Hannan, Jason (ed.), Philosophical profiles in the theory of communication, New York: Peter Lang, pp. 261–289, ISBN 9781433126345.
- Steiner, Linda (2014), "Feminist ethics and global media", in Fortner, Robert S.; Fackler, P. Mark (eds.), The handbook of global communication and media ethics, Chichester Malden, Massachusetts: Wiley-Blackwell, pp. 171–192, ISBN 9781118721377.

Also as: doi:10.1002/9781444390629.ch10

- Steiner, Linda (2014), "Feminist media theory", in Fortner, Robert S.; Fackler, P. Mark (eds.), The handbook of media and mass communication theory, Chichester, West Sussex, UK: Wiley, pp. 359–379, ISBN 9780470675052.

Also as: doi:10.1002/9781118591178.ch20

- Steiner, Linda (2015), "Glassy architectures of journalism", in Steiner, Linda; Carter, Cynthia; McLaughlin, Lisa (eds.), The Routledge companion to media & gender, London New York: Routledge, pp. 620–631, ISBN 9781138849129.

=== Journal articles ===
- Steiner, Linda (September 1988). "The role of readers in reporting texts". Journalism & Mass Communication Quarterly. 65 (3): 642–647. doi:10.1177/107769908806500312. S2CID 144368668.
- Steiner, Linda (1989). "Feminist theorizing and communication ethics". Communication. 12 (3): 157–173.
- Steiner, Linda (editor); Fejes, Fred; Petrich, Kevin (1993). "Invisibility, homophobia and heterosexism: lesbians, gays and the media". Critical Studies in Mass Communication. 10 (4): 395–422. doi:10.1080/15295039309366878.
- Steiner, Linda (June 2002). "A editorial comment". Journalism & Mass Communication Quarterly. 79 (2): 270–271. doi:10.1177/107769900207900201. PMID 11465728. S2CID 143951362.
- Steiner, Linda (June 2002). "The feminist cable collective as public sphere activity". Journalism. 6 (3): 313–334. doi:10.1177/1464884905054063. S2CID 143755339.
- Steiner, Linda; Choi, Yisook; Kim, Sooah (2006). "Claiming feminist space in Korean cyberterritory". Javnost - the Public: Journal of the European Institute for Communication and Culture. 13 (2): 65–84. doi:10.1080/13183222.2006.11008913. S2CID 144713372.
- Steiner, Linda; Haas, Tanni (May 2006). "Public journalism: a reply to critics". Journalism. 7 (2): 238–254. doi:10.1177/1464884906062607. S2CID 142115197.
- Steiner, Linda (March 2008). "A manifesto for a genderless feminist critique". Communication, Culture & Critique. 1 (1): 8–19. doi:10.1111/j.1753-9137.2007.00002.x.
- Steiner, Linda (July 2012). "Failed theories: explaining gender difference in journalism". Review of Communication. 12 (3): 201–223. doi:10.1080/15358593.2012.666559. S2CID 144123948.
- Steiner, Linda; Guo, Jing; McCaffrey, Raymond; Hills, Paul (August 2012). "The Wire and repair of the journalistic paradigm". Journalism. 14 (6): 703–720. doi:10.1177/1464884912455901. S2CID 146157813.
- Steiner, Linda; Eckert, Stine (October 2013). "(Re)triggering backlash: responses to news about Wikipedia's gender gap". Journal of Communication Inquiry. 37 (4): 284–303. doi:10.1177/0196859913505618. S2CID 144330321.
- Steiner, Linda; Lokot, Tetyana; Prado, Antonio; Xu, Boya (Spring 2015). "Research in depth: news magazine coverage of the Petraeus/Broadwell affair: the disjunction between power and agency". Media Report to Women. 43 (2): 6–21. Archived from the original on 2015-10-24. Available at academia.edu.

== See also ==
- Cynthia Carter
