= Penny O'Donnell =

Australian media scholar

Penny O'Donnell is an Australian media scholar, author and radio journalist. She is best known for her research on the implications of digital transformation for journalism employment across world regions, comparative media, and journalism, and Southern theory.

== Biography ==
O'Donnell received a Bachelor of Arts (Honours) from University of Melbourne in 1981, a Masters of Social Communication from the Iberoamericana University, Mexico, in 1993 and her PhD from University of Technology, Sydney in 2006. A former journalist for the Australian Broadcasting Corporation (ABC), she began lecturing at the School of Journalism at the Central American University in Managua, Nicaragua, before returning to Australia to teach at University of Technology Sydney, receiving a Team Teaching Award for creating new dialogues about race, power, subjectivity, and intercultural communication. She joined University of Sydney as Senior Lecturer in International Media and Journalism in 2008, where she is also Degree Director for the Master of Media Practice. O'Donnell serves on the Editorial Board of Journalism and Mass Communication Educator and the Advisory Board of Global Media Journal — Australian edition.

O'Donnell's interest in Central American culture and media started when she made a documentary on the 1985 International Peace March from Panama to Mexico, broadcast on the ABC. She returned a year later to Nicaragua for three years and published a book about the experience. Death Dreams & Dancing in Nicaragua, is a travel memoir which also provides a case study to demonstrate the importance of radio education for impoverished communities. O'Donnell then moved to Mexico City to study a Masters in Social Communication and her research thesis, Dar la palabra al pueblo: La enseñanza-aprendizaje de la comunicación en Nicaragua durante la Revolución Popular Sandinista (Giving the word to the people: the teaching-learning of communication in Nicaragua during the Sandinista Popular Revolution), was later published by the Iberoamericana Universidad, Mexico and is cited in the Encyclopedia of Social Movement Media.

In 1995, after returning to Australia, she co-authored the book Australians against racism: Testimonies from the anti-apartheid movement in Australia. In 2012 she co-authored a monograph, Journalism at the Speed of Bytes: Australian Newspapers in the 21st Century, about what the transition to digital-first news production means for the future of newspapers, professional journalists, and news quality.

O'Donnell has co-presented submissions to Australian government inquiries into the media and journalism, including Hon R Finklestein's 2012 inquiry into media regulation, the 2017 Future of Public Interest Journalism Inquiry, and in 2018 the Select Committee on the Future of Work and Workers.

O'Donnell is a member of:

- International Communication Association (ICA)
- International Association for Media and Communication Research (IAMCR)
- Journalism Education and Research Association of Australia (JERAA)

=== Australian Research Council ===
O'Donnell was funded by the Australian Research Council (ARC) in 2009 as Lead Chief Investigator into the future of newspapers, along with Associate Professor David McKnight, from University of New South Wales. In 2012 she became Chief Investigator on the ARC-funded New Beats Project, which involved seven journalism academics from five Australian universities. The study focused on the mass redundancies of 3000 journalists who lost their jobs in Australia between 2012 and 2014. A second round of ARC funding allowed the research to expand internationally and New Beats II included collaborators such as Professor Mark Deuze in the Netherlands, as well as academics in Canada, Indonesia, South Africa, and USA.

=== Books ===
- O'Donnell, Penny (1991) Death Dreams & Dancing in Nicaragua, ABC Enterprises, Crows Nest, Australia.
- O'Donnell, Penelope (1995) Dar la palabra al pueblo: La enseñanza-aprendizaje de la comunicación en Nicaragua durante la Revolución Popular Sandinista, Universidad Iberoamericana, Mexico.
- O'Donnell, Penny & Simons, Lynette (1995) Australians against racism: Testimonies from the anti-apartheid movement in Australia, Pluto Press, Australia.
- O'Donnell, P., McKnight, D., Este, J. (2012). Journalism at the Speed of Bytes: Australian Newspapers in the 21st Century. Sydney, Australia: Walkley Foundation

=== Submissions ===
- O'Donnell, P., Zion, L., Ricketson, M., Dodd, A., Marjoribanks, T., Sherwood, M., Winarnita, M., Harper, R. (2018), Submission to the Select Committee on the Future of Work and Workers from the New Beats Project, Submission 140.
- Zion, L., Dodd, A., Marjoribanks, T., O'Donnell, P., Ricketson, M., Sherwood, M., Winarnita, M., Harper, R. (2017), New Beats Project Submission to the Senate Select Committee on the Future of Public Interest Journalism, Submission 37.
- Dwyer, T., Martin, F., O'Donnell, P. (2017), Submission to the Select Committee on the Future of Public Interest Journalism, Submission 44. June 2017.
- McKnight, D. & O'Donnell, P. (2011), Submission to the Independent Inquiry into the Media and Media Regulation, November 2011.

== Selected scholarly publications ==
- O'Donnell, P., Zion, L. (2019). Precarity in Media Work. In Mark Deuze, Mirjam Prenger (Eds.), Making Media: Production, Practices, and Professions, (pp. 223–234). Amsterdam: Amsterdam University Press
- Cohen, N., Hunter, A., O'Donnell, P. (2019). Bearing the Burden of Corporate Restructuring: Job Loss and Precarious Employment in Canadian Journalism. Journalism Practice, 13(7), (pp. 817–833)
- O'Donnell, P. (2018). Australian Journalists at Work. In Eric Freedman, Robyn S. Goodman, Elanie Steyn (Eds.), Critical Perspectives on Journalistic Beliefs and Actions: Global Experiences, (pp. 24–34). New York: Routledge
- Zion, L., Sherwood, M., O'Donnell, P., Marjoribanks, T., Ricketson, M., Dodd, A., Winarnita, M. (2018). New Beats Report: Mass redundancies and career change in Australian journalism, (pp. 1–28). Melbourne, Australia: The New Beats Project
- Sherwood, M., O'Donnell, P. (2018). Once a Journalist, Always a Journalist? Industry Restructure, Job Loss and Professional Identity. Journalism Studies, 19(7), 1021–1038
- O'Donnell, P. (2017). Journalism Education in Australia: Educating Journalists for Convergent, Cosmopolitan, and Uncertain News Environments. In Robyn S. Goodman, Elanie Steyn (Eds.), Global Journalism Education in the 21st Century: Challenges and Innovations, (pp. 17–40). Austin: The University of Texas at Austin
