= WEHCO Media =

American media company

WEHCO Media, Inc.
- Type: Private
- Industry: Media
- Headquarters: Little Rock, Arkansas, United States
- Key people: Walter E. Hussman Jr. (chairman)
- Website: www.wehco.com

WEHCO Media, Inc., based in Little Rock, AR is a privately held media company with holdings that include newspapers, cable television systems, and internet service. Walter E. Hussman Jr. is the chairman. Hussmann is the grandson of Clyde E. Palmer, whose media holdings formed the basis of WEHCO Media. WEHCO is an acronym for Walter E. Hussman Company.

The company publishes nine daily newspapers serving three states, as well as eight English-language nondaily newspapers and two Spanish-language publications. They include the Arkansas Democrat-Gazette and the Texarkana Gazette. Among the smaller papers in Arkansas are the Hot Springs Sentinel-Record, The Camden News, the Magnolia Banner-News, and the El Dorado News-Times.

The company also operates cable television systems in Arkansas under the WEHCO Video division - Pine Bluff Cable TV in Pine Bluff, Resort TV Cable in Hot Springs, Cam-Tel Company in Camden, Hope Community TV in Hope, Prescott Video in Prescott, White County Video in Searcy, Augusta Video in Augusta (Woodruff County) and East Arkansas Video in Forrest City. In Texas - Longview Cable TV in Longview and Kilgore Video in Kilgore, Texas. Also, WEHCO Video holdings include Vicksburg Video in Vicksburg, MS and Tahlequah Cable TV in Tahlequah, OK.

In years past, the company held several radio stations and a TV station. They included KCMC-AM (Texarkana, TX), KTAL-FM 98.1 (Texarkana, TX - Shreveport, LA), KTAL-TV (NBC) Channel 6 (Texarkana, TX - Shreveport, LA). KCMC and KTAL-TV and FM continue to operate under different owners today. WEHCO Media also owned KAMD-910 AM and KWEH-97.1 FM in Camden, AR. KWEH stood for the owners initials Walter E. Hussman). KAMD ceased broadcasting on August 31, 1995, and KWEH-FM is now known as KAMD-FM, owned by Radio Works Inc. and Jay W. Bunyard.

== History ==
Publisher Clyde E. Palmer started what would become WEHCO Media after completing a series of acquisitions of newspapers in Arkansas and Texas. He purchased the Magnolia Banner-News in March 1928, El Dorado News in May 1928, and soon launched an evening edition called the El Dorado Times. He acquired The Star of Hope and Hope Morning Press in January 1929, Cameden News in February 1929, the Hot Springs Sentinel-Record in December 1929, formed the Hope Star through a merger in April 1932, then purchased the Texarkana Gazette and Texarkana Daily News in March 1933. A year later he acquired the Texarkana Daily Press and consolidated it.

In January 1948, Palmer, president of Texarkana Newspapers, Inc., appointed his son-in-law Walter E. Hussman as publisher of the Cameden News. In July 1957, Palmer died. That September, Hussman was named publisher of Palmer Newspapers.

In March 1974, WEHCO acquired the Arkansas Democrat of Little Rock. In July 1988, Hussman died and was succeeded by his son, Walter E. Hussman Jr.

In October 1991, the company acquired the Arkansas Gazette from Gannett and merged with the Democrat to form the Arkansas Democrat-Gazette.

In April 1998, the Chattanooga Free Press was acquired, followed a few months later by the purchase of the Chattanooga Times. The two were merged in January 1999 to form the Chattanooga Times Free Press.

In March 2008, WEHCO announced its purchase of three papers in Missouri: the Jefferson City News Tribune, the Fulton Sun (both dailies) and the California Democrat (a weekly).

In October 2009, WEHCO merged its Northwest Arkansas media interests with Stephens Media to form the joint venture Northwest Arkansas Newspapers LLC.

In August 2010, WEHCO and Righthaven LLC, an Las Vegas, Nevada based law firm, joined into an agreement for Righthaven to sue bloggers on WEHCO's behalf for copyright violations.

In May 2016, Stephens Media sold its interest in the joint venture to WEHCO, which then assumed all control of operations of the newspapers in the joint venture.

In August, WEHCO acquired the Pine Bluff Commercial from Gannett.

In December 2025, WEHCO sold the Jefferson City News Tribune, Fulton Sun and California Democrat to Faughn Media, LLC. In March 2026, the Pine Bluff Commercial was sold to Newsroom Ventures LLC. In July 2026, the Chattanooga Times Free Press was sold to Craig Fuller and his father Max Fuller. In October 2026, 28 people, amounting to 25% of staff, were laid off.
