= News Tribune =

News Tirbune may refer to:

- The News Tribune in Tacoma, Washington
- News Tribune (Jefferson City) in Jefferson City, Missouri
- News and Tribune in Jeffersonville, Indiana
- Rome News-Tribune in Rome, Georgia
