= Journalism & Communication Monographs =

- Discipline: Communication, Journalism
- Language: English
- Edited by: Linda Steiner

Publication details
- History: 1999-present
- Publisher: SAGE Publications
- Frequency: Quarterly

Standard abbreviations
- ISO 4: Journal. Commun. Monogr.

Indexing
- ISSN: 1522-6379 (print); 2161-4342 (web)
- LCCN: 98004957
- OCLC no.: 40389629

Links
- Journal homepage; Online access; Online archive

Journalism & Communication Monographs is a quarterly peer-reviewed academic journal that covers the fields of journalism and mass communication. The editor-in-chief is Linda Steiner (Philip Merrill College of Journalism, University of Maryland). It was established in 1999 and is currently published by SAGE Publications in association with the Association for Education in Journalism and Mass Communication.

== Abstracting and indexing ==
Journalism & Communication Monographs is abstracted and indexed in Communication Abstracts.
