= Barbara Adam =

British university teacher and writer

- Born: 5 March 1945 (age 81)
- Occupations: Lecturer, Cardiff University; Professor emerita of sociology, Cardiff University; Founding editor, Time & Society
- Awards: Philip Abrams Memorial Prize, British Sociological Association 1991; J T Fraser Prize, International Society 1995
- Honours: Academician of the Academy of Social Sciences (2009) Academician of the Learned Society of Wales (2013)

Barbara E. Adam, FAcSS, FLSW (born 5 March 1945) is a retired British sociologist and academic. She specialises in social theory particularly in reference to time. From 1988 to her retirement in 2011, she lectured at Cardiff University; she was appointed professor of sociology in 1999. She is the founding editor of the academic journal Time & Society.

== Early life and education ==
Adam was educated in Germany before moving to the United Kingdom, where she spent her academic career at Cardiff University. She earned both her Ph.D. and D.Sc. in sociology at Cardiff, specialising in time studies.

== Academic career ==
Adam joined the faculty of Cardiff University, where she advanced an innovative temporal approach to social theory, epistemology, and methodology. Her transdisciplinary work is taught across the arts, the humanities and the social sciences. She was awarded two major ESRC Research Fellowships (1994 and 2003) as well as senior Fellowships in Potsdam, Germany and Cagliari, Italy as well as Durham and Bristol, UK. From 1999 to 2000, she held the Max Weber Chair at LMU Munich.

In 1992, Adam set up the international journal Time & Society, providing an institutional platform for the emerging interdisciplinary field focused on social time.

== Honours ==
In 1991, she was awarded the Philip Abrams Memorial Prize by the British Sociological Association for her monograph Time and Social Theory. In 1995, she was awarded the J T Fraser Prize by the International Society for the Study of Time for her monograph Timewatch: The Social Analysis of Time.

In 2009, she was elected an academician of the Academy of Social Sciences (AcSS); in 2014, Academicians were retitled Fellows (FAcSS) to bring the Academy of Social Sciences inline with other British learned societies.

In 2013, she was elected as a fellow of the Learned Society of Wales (FLSW).

== Selected work ==
=== Research monographs ===
- Adam, Barbara (1990). Time and Social Theory. Cambridge: Polity Press; Philadelphia: Temple, UP. ISBN 978-0-7456-0740-5.
  - Japanese translation: 1997 Hosei University Press, Tokyo. ISBN 978-4-588-00587-9.
  - Chinese translation: 2008: Beijing Normal University Publishing Group, Beijing ISBN 978-7-303-09619-0.
- Adam, Barbara (1995). Timewatch: The Social Analysis of Time. Cambridge: Polity Press; Williston, VT: Blackwell. ISBN 978-0-7456-1020-7
  - German translation. (2005) Das Diktat der Uhr, transl. Frank Jakubzik, Frankfurt, a.M.: Suhrkamp, Edition Zweite Moderne ISBN 978-3-518-41678-5 .
  - Italian translation. (2005) Timewatch. Per un’analise sociale del tempo, transl. Ester Dornetti, Milano: Baldini Castoldi Dalai. ISBN 978-88-8490-653-3
  - Korean translation.( 2009) ILSIN Publishing Company ISBN 978-89-7410-391-0.
- Adam, Barbara (1998). Timescapes of Modernity: The Environment and Invisible Hazards. London: Routledge. ISBN 978-0-415-16274-6
- Adam, Barbara (2004). Time. Cambridge, Malden, MA: Polity. Polity. ISBN 978-0-7456-2777-9.
  - Slovenian translation. (2010) Čas, Ljubljana: Maribor. ISBN 978-961-6620-16-1
  - Polish translation. (2011) Czas, Warszawa: Wydawnictwo Sic!. ISBN 978-83-60457-90-0
- Adam, Barbara; Groves, Chris (2007). Future Matters: Action, Knowledge, Ethics. Leiden: Brill. ISBN 978-90-04-16177-1.
- Adam Barbara; Oliver, Seth (2026). Drawing Futures: An Alchemy of Words and Images Cardiff: Graffeg. ISBN 85728-328-7 (hb), ISBN 978-1-80595-153-7.

=== Edited works ===
- Adam, Barbara; Allan, Stuart (1995). Theorising Culture: An Interdisciplinary Critique After Postmodernism. London: UCL Press, New York: NYUP. ISBN 85728-328-7 (hb), ISBN 85728-329-5 (pb).
- Adam, Barbara; Geissler, Karlheiz; Held, Martin (1997) Die Non-Stop Gesellschaft und ihr Preis. Stuttgart/Leipzig: Hirzel, Wissenschaftliche Verlagsgesellschaft. ISBN 978-3-7776-0796-2(pb).
- Adam, Barbara; Allan, Stuart; Carter, Cynthia, eds. (1999). Environmental Risks and the Media. London: Routledge. ISBN 978-0-415-21446-9.
- Adam, Barbara; Beck, Ulrich; van Loon, Joost (2000). The Risk Society and Beyond. Critical Issues for Social Theory. London and Thousand Oaks: Sage. ISBN 978-0-7619-6469-8 (hb), ISBN 978-0-7619-6469-8 (pb).
  - Chinese translation: 2005 Beijing House Publishing Group, pp. 366. ISBN 978-7-200-06164-2 (pb).
- Adam, Barbara; Whipp, Richard; Sabelis, Ida (2002) Making Time. Time and Management in Modern Organizations. Oxford: Oxford UP. ISBN 978-0-19-925370-8(hb), ISBN 978-0-19-925370-8 (pb).
  - Chinese translation 2010: Beijing Normal University Press, Beijing. ISBN 978-7-303-09915-3 .
