= UNC Hussman School of Journalism and Media =

Journalism school at Chapel Hill, North Carolina

Coordinates: 35°54′36.81″N 79°3′6.66″W

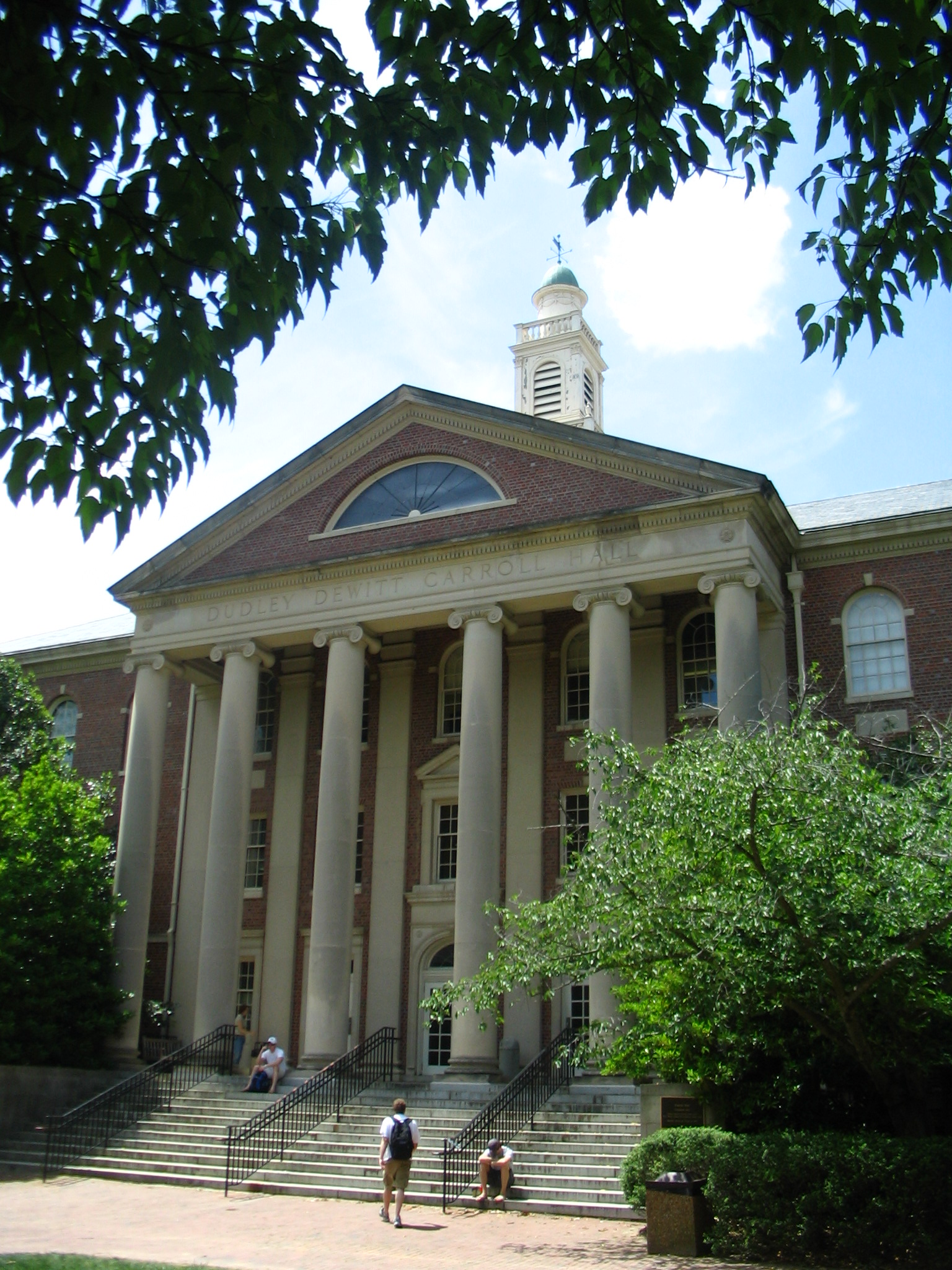
- Carroll Hall on UNC's campus
- Former names: School of Journalism; School of Journalism & Mass Communication; School of Media & Journalism
- Motto: Start Here. Never Stop.
- Preceding agency: Department of Journalism (1924-1950)
- Type: Journalism school
- Established: 1950; 76 years ago
- Parent institution: University of North Carolina at Chapel Hill
- Dean: Susan King
- Sr. associate deans: C.A. Tuggle; Heidi Hennink-Kaminski
- Location: Chapel Hill, North Carolina
- Website: hussman.unc.edu

The UNC Hussman School of Journalism and Media is the undergraduate and graduate journalism school at the University of North Carolina at Chapel Hill.

The school was founded in 1950. The school offers undergraduate degrees in media & journalism as well as advertising & public relations. It offers master's degrees in journalism, strategic communication, and visual communication and doctoral degrees in media & communication.

The school is home to the North Carolina Journalism, Advertising, Public Relations and Broadcasting Halls of Fame.

== Background ==
The first University of North Carolina at Chapel Hill journalism class was taught in 1909. The Department of Journalism was founded in 1924. It became a school in 1950. In 1990, Mass Communication was added to the name. In 1999, the school moved into Carroll Hall. The school has been nationally accredited since 1958 by the Accrediting Council on Education in Journalism and Mass Communication (ACEJMC).

Susan King has been dean of the school since January 1, 2012. King came to the school from the Carnegie Corporation of New York, where she was vice president for external affairs and program director for the journalism initiative. Dulcie Straughan was interim dean of the school in 2011. Jean Folkerts served as dean of the school from 2006 to 2011. Folkerts followed Tom Bowers, who had served as interim dean for one year and had been on the faculty since 1971. Bowers followed Richard Cole, who was dean of the School for 26 years, from 1979-2005.

== History ==
English professor Edward Kidder Graham taught the first journalism course at UNC, English 16: "Journalism." The two-credit course was described as "the history of journalism; the technique of style; the structure of the news story; and the study of modern journals" in the 1909-10 academic catalog.

The Department of Journalism was founded in 1924 with Gerald W. Johnson, an editorial writer for the Greensboro Daily News, as its first chairman. With a six-course curriculum, students could earn a Bachelor of Arts in Journalism degree.

The department offered its first broadcast journalism course, Journalism 67, "Radio News and Features," in 1943. In 1946, faculty member Stuart Sechriest taught the first photography course, Journalism 80, "News Photography."

Lola Lee Mustard became the school's first female faculty member in 1948.

Led by UNC journalism graduate Holt McPherson in 1949, the School of Journalism Foundation of North Carolina was incorporated to raise funds to advance journalism at the school. The money collected provided student aid, chaired professorships and equipment. The foundation continues to fulfill this mission today.

The department became the School of Journalism Sept. 1, 1950, with Skipper Coffin as dean. Coffin was succeeded in 1953 by Norval Neil Luxon, at the time an assistant to the president of Ohio State University.

Norval Neil Luxon created the master's of arts program in 1955, and the first M.A. degree was awarded in 1957. The doctoral program began in 1964.

The school was first accredited by the American Council on Education in Journalism (ACEJ) in 1958. Since that time, the school has earned reaccreditation every six years.

The school moved into Howell Hall during the fall semester of 1960.

Lester Carson, the school's first black student and one of the first black undergraduates at the University, graduated in 1963. The same year, Karen L. Parker, the University's first black female undergraduate, enrolled in journalism classes.

Luxon relinquished his deanship in 1964, and Wayne Danielson became dean. Danielson left the school in 1969, and John B. "Jack" Adams took over. Adams' tenure included the implementation of the spelling and grammar test developed by faculty members Tom Bowers and Richard Cole. The test still is required of all students to graduate with a journalism degree. On Feb. 1, 1975, NBC News aired a report about the test on a national television newscast.

As of 1977, accreditation was granted on a sequence-by-sequence basis. As a test case in 1978, the school became the first journalism program in the nation to receive unit-wide accreditation.

Richard Cole became dean in 1979 after Adams stepped down. The same year, Harry Amana became the school's first black faculty member.

Carol Reuss revived public relations courses in 1980 – more than 50 years after Robert Madry taught two educational publicity courses. By 1982, PR was an optional specialization of the news-editorial sequence, and by 1991, public relations became a separate sequence.

With Reed Sarratt as president, the school formed the Journalism Alumni and Friends Association (JAFA) on January 26, 1980. The group continues to keep alumni connected to the school. The N.C. Journalism Hall of Fame was created in 1981 to honor individuals who have made outstanding and career-long contributions to journalism. Honorees have to have been born in or become distinctly identified with North Carolina. Dean Cole and Gene Robert of the Philadelphia Inquirer created the school's Board of Visitors – now the Board of Advisers – during the 1988-89 academic year. The board is a vehicle to involve a variety of alumni and other media professionals more closely in the school.

The school changed its name to the School of Journalism and Mass Communication to more accurately reflect the diversity and broadness of instruction. At the time, more than 70 percent of the school's undergraduates were in programs other than news-editorial journalism.

The school created the visual communication sequence in 1991, and the dissolution of the Radio, Television and Motion Pictures program in 1993 brought several new faculty members to the school. The broadcast sequence became electronic communication in 1994.

In 1995, the Park Foundation of Ithaca, N.Y., which later became the Triad Foundation, pledged $5.5 million for the first five years of the Park Fellowship Program, funding graduate educations in the school. The foundation also gave $1 million to construct the Park Library in Carroll Hall. It continues to be the school's largest benefactor.

The school moved from Howell Hall to Carroll Hall in 1999.

"Carolina Week," the school's student-produced newscast, debuted Feb. 2, 2000, under the supervision of professors Charlie Tuggle and Richard Simpson. Cole stepped down as dean in 2005, and longtime faculty member Tom Bowers served as interim dean. Jean Folkerts, former director of the School of Media and Public Affairs at George Washington University, became the school's seventh dean in 2006. In 2009, Folkerts led the school through reaccreditation and oversaw the implementation of an ambitious new curriculum to better reflect the changing media environment. Folkerts stepped down as dean on June 30, 2011, and faculty member Dulcie Straughan was interim dean until January 2012, when Susan King became dean.

The school was renamed July 1, 2015, to the UNC School of Media and Journalism.

In September 2019, UNC alumnus Walter E. Hussman Jr. and his wife, Ben, donated $25 million to the school. The school was subsequently renamed the UNC Hussman School of Journalism and Media.

In April 2021, the University of North Carolina announced Nikole Hannah-Jones would join the Hussman School in July 2021 as the Knight Chair in Race and Investigative Journalism, and the school's tenure committee recommended approval of her application for tenure. Hannah-Jones was the subject of criticism, particularly from conservative groups who expressed disagreement with the 1619 Project and questioned Hannah-Jones's credentials. The University Board of Trustees chose not to approve her tenure. Unable to offer tenure without approval by its trustees, UNC announced they would instead offer a fixed five-year contract with an option for tenure review—terms to which Hannah-Jones agreed. More than 40 Hussman faculty members signed a statement criticizing the board's inaction, noting that the previous two Knight Chairs were given tenure and claiming that UNC "unfairly moves the goal posts" by not offering Hannah-Jones the same. The school's Black Caucus condemned the terms of her contract, and some students joined faculty in protests. Hannah-Jones stated, "It's pretty clear that my tenure was not taken up because of political opposition, because of discriminatory views against my viewpoint and, I believe, [because of] my race and my gender." In late June 2021, Hannah-Jones, via a letter from her lawyers, said she will not take a faculty position with the university unless it is offered as a tenured position. On June 30, 2021, the Trustees for the University of North Carolina at Chapel Hill voted in a closed session to include tenure in the position offer. However, Hannah-Jones refused the position and decided to accept a tenured position at Howard University instead, where she became be the inaugural Knight Chair in Race and Journalism.

In May 2022, the school's accreditation was downgraded by ACEJMC citing diversity issues.

== Institutes and affiliates ==
According to the schools official website, there are currently six institutes and affiliate agencies and organizations under the school. Descriptions of each are listed below.

=== Heelprint Communications ===
Founded in 2009, the stated is a student-run communications agency which focuses on advancing public relations, marketing, and advertising services developed by other students.

=== NC Media and Journalism Hall of Fame ===
Originally founded in 1981, the stated recognizes five people each year who have contributed the most to "outstanding and career-long contributions to the fields of advertising, journalism, media or public relations," according to a panel of 12 committee members. The hall of fame was redesigned multiple times before it took its current form in 2016 as a hall of fame for all media forms.

=== North Carolina College Media Association (NCCMA) ===
Founded in December 2007, the media association hosts annual conferences and contests to help promote and recognize the best college-run media outlets in the state; including newspapers, magazines, yearbooks, and websites.

=== North Carolina Scholastic Media Association (NCSMA) ===
Originally founded in 1936 locally and becoming statewide in 1941, the media association is run by both students and educators, and hosts annual contests and critiques to help promote and recognize the best middle and high school media outlets in the state. The four critique awards offered are those of 'Achievement', 'Honor', 'Distinction', and 'All-North Carolina', going in order of least to most prestigious. The media association also offers journalist and principal of the year awards, as well as a distinguished service award for those who have made significant contributions to journalism within the state.

=== Park Library ===
Founded in July 1999, the 5,000 sq. ft. library was named in honor of North Carolina native Roy H. Park, and serves as a primary place for staff to help students with questions, especially those relating to their library catalog, courses, and research. As of 2023, the facility holds over 10,000 books, and over 1,000 online journals.

=== UNC BlueSky Innovations ===
The stated is an organization run by educators and students which works to "improve storytelling and education through technological innovation". Primarily using augmented reality and artificial intelligence, the organization has worked toward finding better ways of conveying news and other media by collaborating with consumers and other journalism schools and companies.

== Academics ==
=== Undergraduate Program ===
The school has two broad curricula for undergraduate majors: journalism and advertising/public relations with students receiving a bachelor of arts in media and journalism.

The journalism curriculum offers five sequences:

- Editing and graphic design
- Electronic communication
- Multimedia
- Photojournalism
- Reporting

The advertising/public relations curriculum offers three sequences:

- Advertising
- Public relations
- Strategic communication

The school also offers a separate business journalism major, in conjunction with the Kenan–Flagler Business School, which follows a separate application policy. The program was created in 2004 to produce a path for students interested in enrolling in both prestigious professional schools that previously did not exist. Its curriculum prepares students for positions primarily in journalism, but also in public relations and internal communications. It is the only such program in the UNC system, and the only such undergraduate program at any public university east of the Mississippi River.

=== Graduate Program ===
The UNC Hussman School of Media and Journalism offers three graduate degrees: a master of arts in mass communication; a master of arts in technology and communication, which is an online degree; and a doctor of philosophy in mass communication. The school also offers an online graduate certificate in technology and communication. About 25 new master's students and 10 doctoral students are admitted each year. Total enrollment is about 50 master's and 40 doctoral students.

The Roy H. Park Fellowships provide graduate students with fully paid tuition, fees, health insurance and stipends. In the 2008-2009 academic year, master's students will receive a stipend of $14,000 and doctoral students $20,500. An additional $2,000 for research and travel is available.

The program also supports the Roy H. Park Distinguished Lecture Series and Visiting Professorship.

=== Special programs ===
- Carolina Business News Initiative
- Business Journalism Major
- Environment and Science Communication Dual-degree Program
- Sports Communication Program
- M.A. / J.D. Dual Degree Program
- Undergraduate Certificate Program in Latino Journalism and Media Studies

== Notable alumni ==
The School's alumni association, "Journalism Alumni and Friends Association", was formed in 1980. The school has more than 10,000 alumni living and working throughout the U.S. and more than 40 countries.

- Dan Ashley - ABC 7 News San Francisco news anchor
- Furman Bisher – Sportswriter and editor
- Hayden Carruth – Poet and winner of National Book Award
- Howie Carr – Journalist and radio talk show host
- W. Horace Carter - Pulitzer Prize winner, publisher and editor emeritus of the Tabor Tribune
- Lawrence Ferlinghetti – Poet and publisher
- Gail Gregg – Artist, photographer and journalist
- Walter E. Hussman Jr. – Publisher of the Arkansas Democrat-Gazette
- Sallie Krawcheck – Chairman and CEO of Citigroup Global Wealth Management, Former CEO of Citigroup Inc.
- Sharon Lawrence – Emmy nominated actress
- Tristan Louis – Internet entrepreneur, activist, and journalist
- Jeff MacNelly – Editorial cartoonist, Pulitzer Prize winner, creator of Shoe Comic strip (did not graduate)
- Vermont C. Royster – Former editor of the Wall Street Journal
- Robert Ruark - Journalist and novelist
- Emily Steel - Pulitzer Prize winner and journalist at the New York Times
- Tom Wicker – Author and New York Times Journalist
- David Zucchino – Pulitzer Prize winner
- Brooke Baldwin - American broadcast journalist
- Kayla Tausche - American broadcast journalist
- Ashlan Gorse - broadcast entertainment journalist
- Stuart Scott - Journalist and ESPN anchor
- Nikole Hannah-Jones - Civil Rights Investigative Journalist, MacArthur Fellowship recipient, and Pulitzer Prize for Commentary winner for The 1619 Project.

== Notable faculty ==
- Linda Carter Brinson – journalist, editor, and writer
- Philip Meyer – author, journalist and professor emeritus
- Chuck Stone – author, journalist and professor emeritus

A number of academic journals in the journalism and mass communication discipline are currently edited by the school's faculty:

- Journalism and Mass Communication Quarterly, the flagship journal of the Association for Education in Journalism and Mass Communication, Dan Riffe (editor-in-chief)
- American Journalism, the flagship journal of the American Journalism Historians Association, Barbara Friedman (editor-in-chief)
- Media Psychology, published by Taylor & Francis, Sri Kalyanaraman (editor)
- Health Communication, published by Taylor & Francis, Brian G. Southwell (senior editor)

== Sources ==
- Bowers, Thomas A. (2009). Making News: One Hundred Years of Journalism and Mass Communication at Carolina. University of North Carolina Press. ISBN 978-0-8078-3331-5.
