= Time & Society =

- Discipline: Interdisciplinary studies
- Language: English
- Edited by: Justin T. Clark

Publication details
- History: 1992–present
- Publisher: SAGE Publications
- Frequency: Quarterly
- Impact factor: 1.891 (2021)

Standard abbreviations
- ISO 4: Time Soc.

Indexing
- CODEN: TIMSEB
- ISSN: 0961-463X (print); 1461-7463 (web)
- LCCN: 93643960
- OCLC no.: 25927736

Links
- Journal homepage; Online access; Online archive

Time & Society is a peer-reviewed academic journal that publishes papers across a range of disciplines including sociology, anthropology, geography, history, and psychology. The current editor-in-chief is Justin T. Clark (Cornell University). It was established in 1992, with its founding editor being Barbara Adam. It is published by SAGE Publications.

== Abstracting and indexing ==
Time & Society is abstracted and indexed in Scopus and the Social Sciences Citation Index. According to the Journal Citation Reports, its 2021 impact factor is 1.891.
