= Hope Star =

Newspaper in Hope, Arkansas, USA

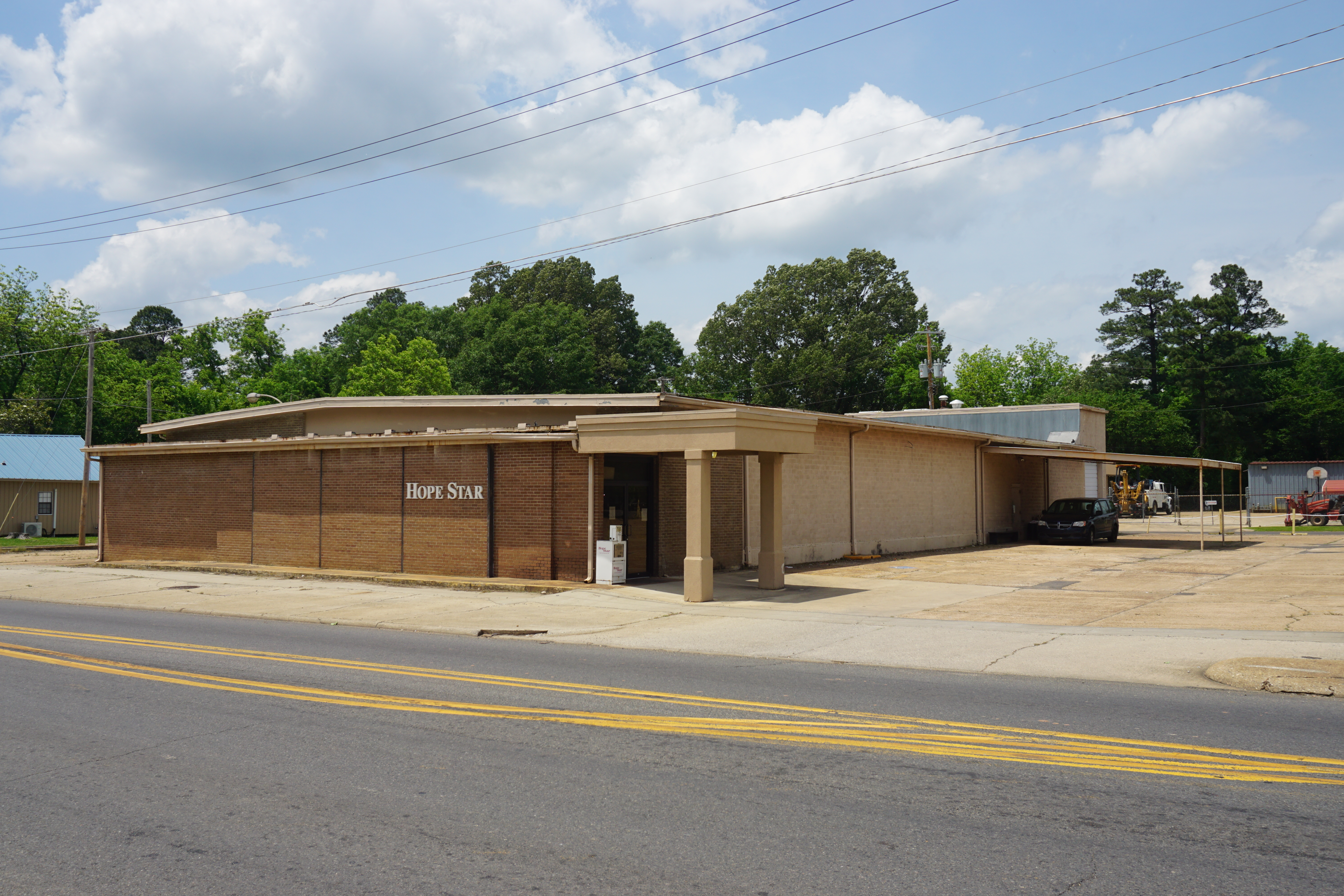
- Hope Star building
- Type: Daily newspaper
- Format: Broadsheet
- Owner: GateHouse Media
- Publisher: Shane Allen
- Editor: Rick Kennedy
- Ceased publication: September 14, 2018
- Headquarters: 522 West Third Street, Hope, Arkansas, United States
- Website: hopestar.com

The Hope Star was a Monday through Friday daily newspaper serving Hope, Arkansas, United States. It was founded on January 18, 1929, from the merger of the Star of Hope and the Hope Daily Press newspapers. The Star of Hope was founded in 1899, while the Hope Daily Press was founded in 1927.

The newspaper's final owner, GateHouse Media (now Gannett), ended publication on September 14, 2018, along with two other area papers it owned, The Daily Siftings Herald of Arkadelphia and the Nevada County Picayune of Prescott. At the time of its closure, the Star had been publishing only two days a week, on Wednesday and Friday.
