= Rodger Dean Duncan =

American Author and Business Consultant

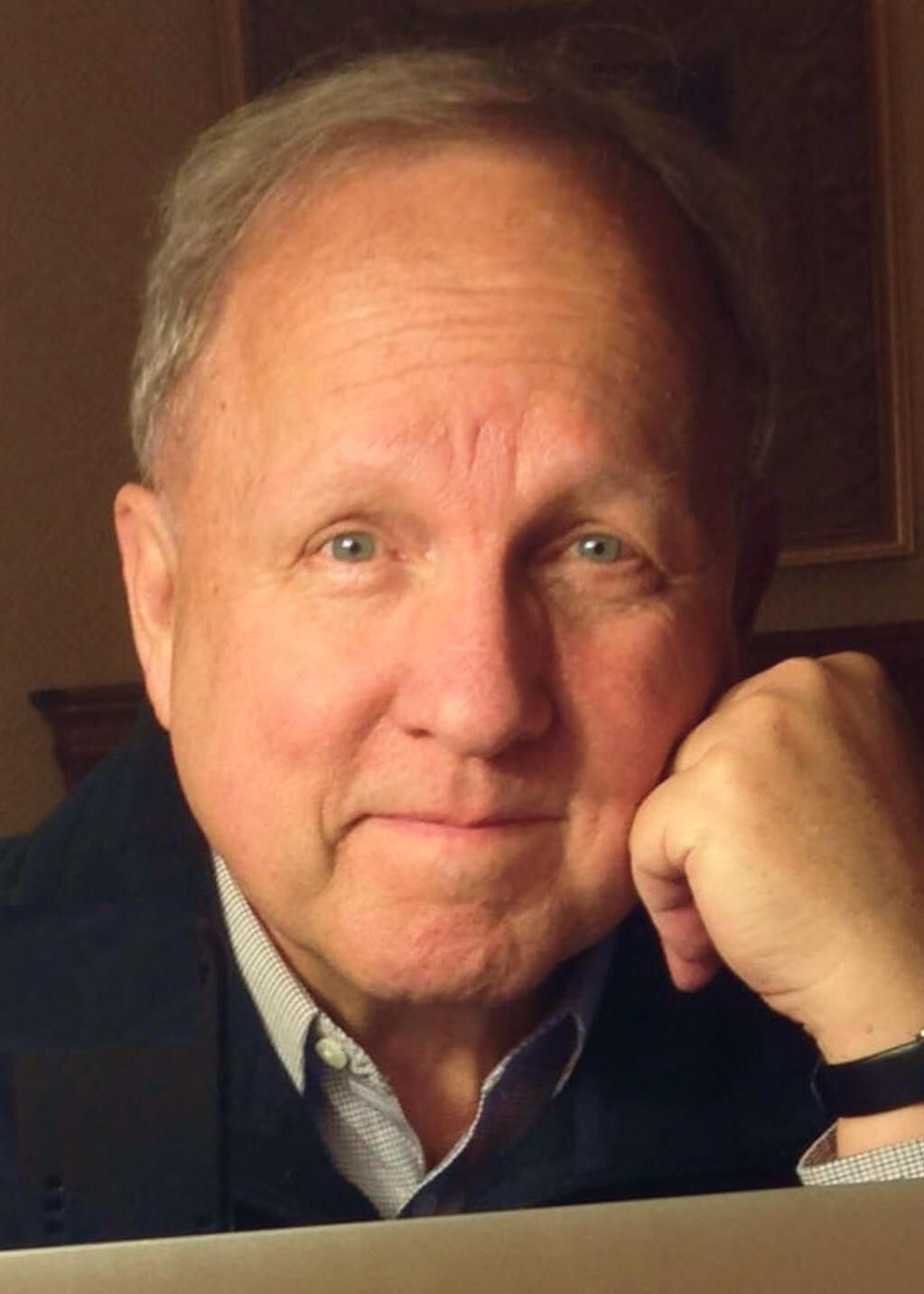
- Born: Oklahoma City, Oklahoma
- Education: Baylor University; Brigham Young University; Purdue University
- Occupations: Business consultant, author, professional speaker
- Political party: Independent
- Spouse: Rean Robbins
- Website: https://leadershop.net

Rodger Dean Duncan (born in Oklahoma City, Oklahoma) is an American author and business consultant whose work focuses on leadership, human performance, and the strategic management of change.

== Consulting ==
After working at F.I. duPont, Glore Forgan & Co., Duncan started his consulting career in 1972. His first client was the Executive Office of the President of the United States. He served as communication counsel to cabinet officers in two White House administrations. He later served in a similar capacity for Republican U.S. Senators Richard Lugar, Orrin Hatch, and Howard Baker.

Another of Duncan's early corporate clients was the Campbell Soup Company, which hired him in 1978 to head the company's global communications operations.

Since the early 1980s, Duncan's consulting work has focused on leadership development, organizational culture, human performance, and change management issues. His private sector clients have included IBM, American Airlines, Eli Lilly and Company, Consolidated Edison of New York, Hallmark Cards, Sprint, Black & Veatch, eBay, Texas Instruments, and many others. In the public sector, Duncan has served the Nuclear Regulatory Commission, the Tennessee Valley Authority, the Bonneville Power Administration, the Federal Reserve Bank, and the United States Army.

== Education ==
Duncan holds a Bachelor of Arts degree from Baylor University where he studied American literature and psychology. At Baylor he was active in student government, president of his senior class, president of the Sigma Tau Delta literary society, and an honor student.

He earned a Master of Arts in communications degree at Brigham Young University, where he also served on the faculty in the Communications Department and was managing director of University Publications.

Duncan earned a Ph.D. in organizational communication at Purdue University. He also served on the Purdue faculty, teaching both undergraduate and graduate courses.

== Early career ==
While an undergraduate at Baylor University, Duncan started a career in journalism as a staff writer for The Waco Tribune-Herald. Duncan later served as religion editor of The Salt Lake Tribune.

In early 1968 Duncan joined the reporting staff at The Fort Worth Star-Telegram where he covered business and politics. His coverage of the Texas gubernatorial campaign that year, as well as his reporting on the national presidential campaign, attracted the attention of Jim Lehrer, who was then a young editor at The Dallas Times Herald. Lehrer persuaded Duncan to move to Dallas, where he continued to cover politics but also served as an investigative reporter. As a young journalist, Duncan interviewed people from a range of backgrounds, including U.S. president Lyndon Johnson, comedian Jack Benny, Baroness Maria von Trapp, cardiac surgery pioneer Michael DeBakey, historian Arnold Toynbee, pollster George Gallup, artist Norman Rockwell, and anthropologist Margaret Mead.

Duncan's reporting earned awards from the American Bar Association and the Associated Press. At the age of 24, he was hired as editor of both The Texarkana Gazette and The Texarkana Daily News. One of the reporters he hired to work with him in Texarkana was Stanley R. Tiner, who later would lead The Sun Herald newspaper in Biloxi-Gulfport, Mississippi, to the Pulitzer Prize.

== Writing ==
In addition to his editing and reporting, Duncan was also a freelance writer. His articles appeared in a range of newspapers, including The Christian Science Monitor, The New York Times, The National Observer, and The Denver Post. He also wrote for magazines such as Parade, Family Weekly, Boys' Life, Writers Digest, and The Saturday Evening Post.

As a young journalist, Duncan wrote “Tongue in Cheek,” a column that was syndicated nationally to small and medium-sized newspapers. Today, Duncan publishes a blog that focuses on leadership and performance improvement issues.

In 2002, Duncan wrote Leadership for Saints, a book intended for lay leaders of The Church of Jesus Christ of Latter-day Saints, but also applicable for a wider audience.

In 2012, he published Change-friendly Leadership: How to Transform Good Intentions Into Great Performance. The book quickly became an international bestseller and won several awards. Duncan is also a regular contributor (more than 700 columns) to Forbes.com, a platform that reaches more than 125 million people each month. In early 2025 he launched a podcast called LeaderSHOP. His guests include well-known thought leaders such as Guy Kawasaki, Dorie Clark, Marshall Goldsmith, Amy Edmondson, and Bill George.

== Family ==
Duncan is the second of Marion Claude Duncan and Helen Colleen Stone Duncan's four children. He is descended from the family of George Rogers Clark, a prominent American military officer during the American Revolutionary War. His older brother is Stephen M. Duncan, who served as Assistant Secretary of Defense under U.S. Presidents Ronald Reagan and George H. W. Bush and is a recognized expert on national security issues.

Duncan lives with his wife Rean Robbins in their family home just outside Kansas City, Missouri. They are parents of four grown children and have 12 grandchildren.
