= Susan King (journalist) =

American journalist

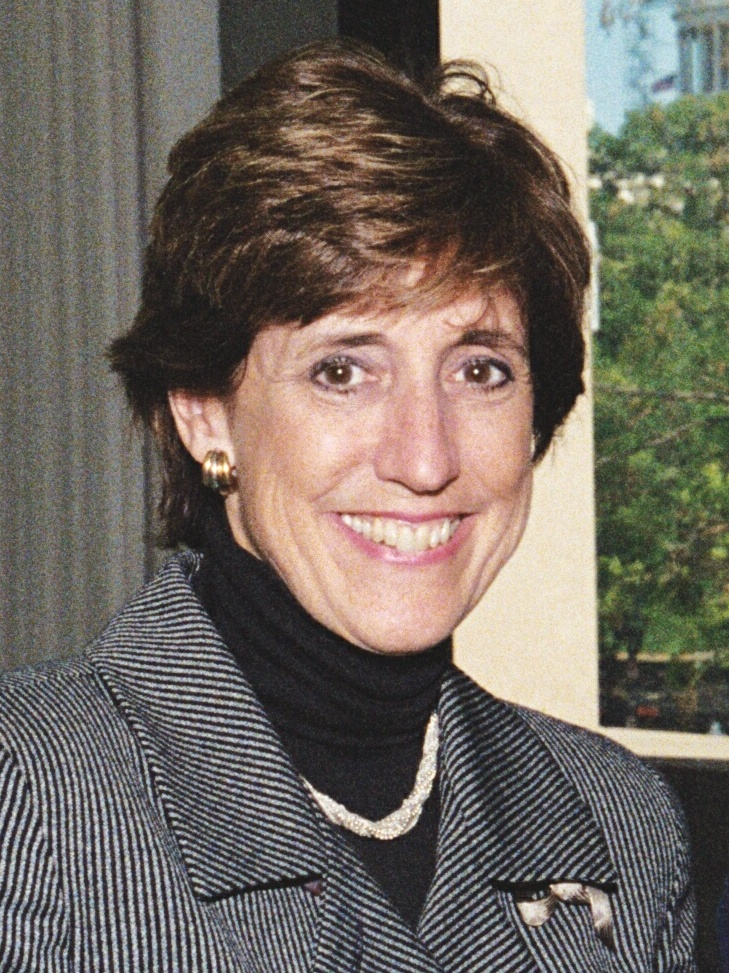

Dean of Hussman School of Journalism and Media
- In office January 1, 2012 – 2021

Personal details
- Born: Susan Robinson
- Education: Marymount College (BA); Fairfield University (MA)
- Occupation: Journalist professor Administrator
- Website: Profile at UNC'S Hussman School of Journalism and Media

Susan King is an American journalist and was the Dean and John Thomas Kerr Distinguished Professor at the Hussman School of Journalism and Media at University of North Carolina at Chapel Hill from 2012 to 2021.

== Education ==
King received a bachelor's degree in English from Marymount College in Tarrytown, New York in 1969. King then received a master's degree in mass communications from the Fairfield University in Fairfield, Connecticut in 1973, where she is currently a member of the Board of Trustees.

== Career ==
King began her career working for Walter Cronkite and became an on-air reporter for WGR-TV in Buffalo, New York. There she became the first woman to anchor the city's newscasts. She then became both an anchor in Washington television (WTOP-TV from 1975–79; WRC-TV from 1983-87 and WJLA from 1987–97) and a political analyst known for cover story reports on politics, diplomacy and major issues of the day. From 1979 to 1983 she worked for ABC News and served as a White House correspondent during the Reagan administration. She has reported for CNN and served as host for CNBC's Equal Time, NPR's Talk of the Nation and WAMU's Diane Rehm Show.

King then worked in the administration of President Bill Clinton for five years as the Assistant Secretary for Public Affairs of the U.S. Department of Labor and as the Executive Director of the Family and Medical Leave Commission.

In 1999, King became the vice president for external affairs for the Carnegie Corporation of New York, where she launched and led the Carnegie-Knight Initiative on the Future of Journalism Education in collaboration with the John S. and James L. Knight Foundation and 12 premier U.S. journalism schools.

== Awards ==
King has won numerous journalism awards including Emmys for her reporting from Lebanon and three National Women's Political Caucus awards. In 2014, King was inducted into the Buffalo Broadcasting Hall of Fame and honored with the Buffalo Bob Smith Award.

== Bibliography ==
- King, Susan (Fall 2011). "Advancing the Carnegie legacy in the U.S. and on the global stage : interviews with two Corporation Vice Presidents". Carnegie Reporter. 6 (3): 32–39.
- — (Spring 2012). "Creating new designs for new schools" (PDF). Carnegie Reporter. 6 (4): 28–32.
