= Journalism & Mass Communication Educator =

- Discipline: Communication, Journalism
- Language: English
- Edited by: Jami Fullerton

Publication details
- Former name: The Journalism Educator
- History: 1958-present
- Publisher: SAGE Publications (United States)
- Frequency: Quarterly

Standard abbreviations
- ISO 4: Journal. Mass Commun. Educ.

Indexing
- ISSN: 1077-6958 (print); 2161-4326 (web)
- LCCN: 95658573
- OCLC no.: 614394295

Links
- Journal homepage; Online access; Online archive

Journalism & Mass Communication Educator is a quarterly peer-reviewed academic journal covering the fields of communication, journalism, and media studies. The editor-in-chief is Jami Fullerton (Oklahoma State University). It traces its roots to a newsletter founded in 1944. The journal was established in 1958 and is currently published by SAGE Publications on behalf of the Association for Education in Journalism and Mass Communication.

Editors of the journal have been Oliver Smith (1958-61), Wallace E. Garets (1961-62), Cornelius S. McCarthy (1963-66), Jacob Jaffe (1967-69), Larue Gilleland (1969-76), William J. Roepke (1976-83), Thomas A. Bowers (1983-88), James A. Crook (1988-2001), Jeremy Cohen (2001-06), Dane S. Claussen (2006-12), Maria B. Marron (2012-17), and Jami Fullerton (since 2017).

== Abstracting and indexing ==
Journalism & Mass Communication Educator is abstracted and indexed in CSA Worldwide Political Science Abstracts, Sociological Abstracts, EBSCO databases, ERIC, ProQuest databases, and Scopus.
