= Pine Bluff Commercial =

Daily newspaper in Pine Bluff, Arkansas, USA

The Pine Bluff Commercial
- First in Southern Arkansas
- Type: Daily newspaper
- Format: Broadsheet
- Owner: Newsroom Ventures LLC
- Founder: The Freeman family
- Editor-in-chief: Byron Tate
- Founded: 1897; 129 years ago
- Language: English
- City: Pine Bluff, Arkansas
- Country: United States
- Website: www.pbcommercial.com

The Pine Bluff Commercial is a newspaper that serves Southern Arkansas and was founded in 1897 as the Pine Bluff Daily Commercial. It was renamed to its current name in 1912. In 1969, the paper won a Pulitzer Prize for editorial writing on civil rights.

== History ==
The paper began as a family owned paper, by the Freeman family, until 1987, when it was sold to Donrey Media Group. The paper had been an afternoon paper from its inception until 1992, when it became a morning paper. Before that transition, weekend papers were still delivered in the morning.

The paper had joined Gannett after Gannett acquired GateHouse in 2019. The paper was part of GateHouse after a line of acquisitions, wherein Donrey became Stephens Media Group in 2002 – after having been acquired by Stephens Media in 1993.

In 2015, Stephens was acquired by New Media Investment Group, which itself was the parent company of GateHouse until New Media merged GateHouse into Gannett in 2019. WEHCO Media acquired the paper from Gannett in 2020, and sold it to Newsroom Ventures LLC, in 2026.

== Pulitzer Prize ==
In 1969, the newspaper was awarded a Pulitzer Prize for editorial journalist, Paul Greenberg. The prize is "[f]or his editorials during 1968."
