= California Democrat =

Newspaper published in California, Missouri

- Type: Weekly newspaper
- Format: Broadsheet
- Owner(s): Faughn Media, LLC
- Publisher: Walter E. Hussman, Jr.
- Editor: Gary Castor
- Founded: 1858; 167 years ago
- Headquarters: 317 S High Street, California, Missouri, United States 65018
- Circulation: 1,591
- Website: californiademocrat.com

The California Democrat is an American weekly newspaper published in California, Missouri. It is owned by Faughn Media, LLC.
