= The Review of Communication =

Communication journal

- Discipline: Communication studies
- Language: English

Publication details
- History: 2003-present
- Publisher: Taylor & Francis on behalf of the National Communication Association
- Frequency: Quarterly

Standard abbreviations
- ISO 4: Rev. Commun.

Indexing
- ISSN: 1535-8593

Links
- Journal homepage

The Review of Communication is a peer-reviewed online academic journal which is published by Taylor & Francis on behalf of the National Communication Association. The Review of Communication publishes original scholarship that supposedly "advances the discipline and practice of communication through the study of major themes that cross disciplinary subfields".

== Abstracting and indexing ==
The journal is abstracted and indexed in

- Communication and Mass Media Complete
- Current Abstracts
