= Journalism & Mass Communication Quarterly =

- Discipline: Communication, media studies
- Language: English
- Edited by: Daniela Dimitrova

Publication details
- Former names: Journalism Bulletin, Journalism Quarterly
- History: 1924-present
- Publisher: SAGE Publishing for the Association for Education in Journalism and Mass Communication
- Frequency: Quarterly
- Impact factor: 3.6 (2022)

Standard abbreviations
- ISO 4: Journal. Mass Commun. Q.

Indexing
- CODEN: JMCQFA
- ISSN: 1077-6990 (print); 2161-430X (web)
- LCCN: 95660796
- OCLC no.: 818197863

Links
- Journal homepage; Online access; Online archive

Journalism & Mass Communication Quarterly is a quarterly peer-reviewed academic journal that covers the field of communication and journalism. The editor-in-chief is Daniela Dimitrova (Iowa State University). The journal was established in 1924 as the Journalism Bulletin, the flagship journal of the Association for Education in Journalism and Mass Communication. It is published by SAGE Publishing in association with the Association for Education in Journalism and Mass Communication. It publishes original articles and book reviews on topics including theoretical and methodological developments in journalism and mass communication, international communication, media technologies and society, advertising, public relations, journalism history, media law and policy, media management and economics, political communication, and health communication.

== Abstracting and indexing ==
The journal is abstracted and indexed in Scopus, EBSCO databases, ProQuest databases, and the Social Sciences Citation Index. According to the Journal Citation Reports, its 2022 impact factor is 3.6.
