= Hot Springs Sentinel-Record =

Daily newspaper in Hot Springs, Arkansas

Sentinel-Record
- Owner(s): WEHCO Media, Inc.
- Language: English
- Headquarters: Hot Springs, Arkansas
- Website: hotsr.com

The Hot Springs Sentinel-Record is a newspaper in Hot Springs, Arkansas, currently privately owned by WEHCO Media, Inc.

Known often and/or historically as Sentinel-Record, or S-R, it emerged as the survivor as a daily newspaper out of multiple newspapers competing in Hot Springs in the late 1800s, which eventually merged in effect; the paper's lineage can be traced to the Daily Sentinel, founded in 1874, and the Record, founded in 1899. Clyde E. Palmer, publisher of other newspapers in Arkansas, purchased the newspaper in 1929. Palmer's media holdings evolved into what is now WEHCO Media.
