= Stuttgart Daily Leader =

- Type: Local news website
- Owner(s): Arkansas County Broadcasters, Inc.
- Publisher: Bobby Caldwell
- Editor: Kristen Siler
- Founded: 1885
- Ceased publication: 2019 (print newspaper)
- Headquarters: Stuttgart, Arkansas
- Website: stuttgartdailyleader.com

The Stuttgart Daily Leader is a local news website covering Stuttgart, in southeast Arkansas.

== History ==
The website's roots are in the community's print newspaper founded in 1885. It is owned by East Arkansas Broadcasters, via its Arkansas County Broadcasters division, having acquired the newspaper assets from former owner GateHouse Media in September 2019, in advance of GateHouse's November 2019 merger with Gannett. GateHouse ceased its publication of the newspaper on September 6, as negotiations for the sale to new ownership were pending. The Leader's current ownership is shared with KWAK (AM), Stuttgart's first radio station, among other stations in the ACB portfolio. The ACB-owned Leader resumed regular local online news coverage in August 2020.

Liberty Group Publishing, an earlier incarnation of GateHouse, acquired the paper from Hollinger in 1997. The Leader primarily focuses on city news, although it also covers Arkansas County news as well. Stuttgart, a predominantly agricultural community and major center of Arkansas's rice growing industry, is located on the Grand Prairie in northern Arkansas County. It began as a colony of German immigrants, and is one of two county seats in Arkansas County alongside DeWitt.
