= Alan McKee =

Academic background
- Education: University of Glasgow
- Thesis: Making race mean: the limits of interpretation in the case of Australian Aboriginality in films and television programs (1996)

Academic work
- Institutions: University of Technology Sydney

Alan McKee is an Australian university professor and researcher of sexualised media.

He has served as the president of the Cultural Studies Association of Australasia and sits on the editorial boards of the academic journals Continuum, M/C Journal, and the magazine Girlfriend Guide to Life.

== Education ==
He originally studied film and television, graduating with a PhD from the University of Glasgow in 1996.

== Career ==
After emigrating to Australia McKee worked at Edith Cowan University and the University of Queensland before moving to the Queensland University of Technology, where he is currently a professor in the Creative Industries Faculty. He has published six academic books and over sixty refereed journal articles and book chapters. These have covered topics such as children and media, indigenous Australians and media, television in Australia, reality tv, soap opera, violence and media, youth and media, Americanisation, and gay and queer representation in the media.

He is best known for his research on pornography. He was the Chief Investigator of 'Understanding pornography in Australia', the first comprehensive examination of the production and consumption of pornography in Australia. This project presented a wide-ranging view of the adult-content industry and its consumers. This research proved controversial for taking an evidence-led approach to understanding sexually explicit media. For example, the project surveyed over 1,000 consumers of pornography and discovered that, for the vast majority, the effects of exposure to sexually explicit material were felt to be positive.

He has also worked in media production, including the television series Big Brother Australia, where he served as media expert in the first season; and script writing for the Australian television series The Sideshow, featuring Paul McDermott (comedian).

== Bibliography ==
Books

- McKee, Alan; Hartley, John (2000). The indigenous public sphere: the reporting and reception of aboriginal issues in the Australian media. Oxford New York: Oxford University Press. ISBN 9780198159995.
- McKee, Alan (2003). Textual analysis a beginner's guide. London Thousand Oaks, California: Sage Publications. ISBN 9780761949930.
- McKee, Alan (2001). Australian television: a genealogy of great moments. South Melbourne, Victoria: Oxford University Press. ISBN 9780195512250.
- McKee, Alan (2004). The public sphere: an introduction. Cambridge New York, New York: Cambridge University Press. ISBN 9780521549905.
- McKee, Alan (2007). Beautiful things in popular culture. Malden, Massachusetts: Blackwell Publishing. ISBN 9781405131919.
- McKee, Alan; Lumby, Catharine; Albury, Katherine (2008). The porn report. Carlton, Victoria: Melbourne University Publishing. ISBN 9780522853407.

Journal articles

- McKee, Alan (January 1996). "Men and how to love them". Social Semiotics. 6 (2): 273–284. doi:10.1080/10350339609384477.

An extended review of: Horrocks, Roger (1995). Male myths and icons: masculinity in popular culture. New York: St. Martin's Press. ISBN 9780312126230.

- McKee, Alan (January 1996). "'Superboong! ... ': The ambivalence of comedy and differing histories of race". Continuum: Journal of Media & Cultural Studies. 10 (2): 44–59. doi:10.1080/10304319609365739.
- McKee, Alan (April 1997). "Fairy tales: How we stopped being 'lesbian and gay' and became 'queer'". Social Semiotics. 7 (1): 21–36. doi:10.1080/10350339709360367.
- McKee, Alan (August 1999). "Resistance in hopeles': assimilating queer theory" (PDF). Social Semiotics. 9 (2): 235–249. doi:10.1080/10350339909360434.
- McKee, Alan (November 2005). "The objectification of women in mainstream pornographic videos in Australia". The Journal of Sex Research. 42 (4): 277–290. doi:10.1080/00224490509552283. PMID 19827232. S2CID 1794110.
- McKee, Alan (2007). "The positive and negative effects of pornography as attributed by consumers". Australian Journal of Communication. 34 (1): 87–104. Pdf.
- McKee, Alan (February 2007). "The relationship between attitudes towards women, consumption of pornography, and other demographic variables in a survey of 1,023 consumers of pornography" (PDF). International Journal of Sexual Health. 19 (1): 31–45. doi:10.1300/J514v19n01_05. S2CID 140790890.
- McKee, Alan (November 2012). "The importance of entertainment for sexuality education". Sex Education: Sexuality, Society and Learning. 12 (5): 499–509. doi:10.1080/14681811.2011.627727. S2CID 145235051.
- McKee, Alan (January 2014). "Humanities and social scientific research methods in porn studies" (PDF). Porn Studies. 1 (1–2): 53–63. doi:10.1080/23268743.2013.859465. hdl:10453/115585.
- McKee, Alan (January 2015). "Methodological issues in defining aggression for content analyses of sexually explicit material" (PDF). Archives of Sexual Behavior. 44 (1): 81–87. doi:10.1007/s10508-013-0253-3. hdl:10453/35544. PMID 24609608. S2CID 36605453.
