= The Daily Siftings Herald =

- Type: Daily newspaper
- Format: Broadsheet
- Owner: GateHouse Media
- Publisher: Teresa Hicks
- Editor: Jamal Brown
- Ceased publication: September 15, 2018
- Headquarters: 205 South 26th Street, Arkadelphia, Arkansas, United States
- Website: www.siftingsherald.com

The Daily Siftings Herald was a daily newspaper serving Arkadelphia in southern Arkansas, United States. It was owned by Donrey Media from 1986 to 1999, when it sold the paper to newspaper investor Rupert Phillips' Better Built Media Group. In 2004, Better Built sold several papers to HarborPoint Media, a company backed by the private equity firm Sandler Capital Management. Liberty Group Publishing (now GateHouse Media) the paper's last owners, acquired several papers from Better Built in 2005. The Daily Siftings Herald was closed on September 15, 2018, due to declining subscribers and increasing operational costs.

Early in his career as a journalist and advertising executive, Arkansas State Representative Andy Mayberry was a sports editor for The Daily Siftings Herald.
