= News Tribune (Jefferson City) =

Newspaper in Jefferson City, Missouri

- Type: Daily newspaper
- Format: Broadsheet
- Owner(s): Faughn Media, LLC
- Founded: 1865; 161 years ago
- Headquarters: 326 East Capital Avenue, Jefferson City, Missouri, United States 65101
- Sister newspapers: California Democrat Fulton Sun
- Website: newstribune.com

The News Tribune is an American daily newspaper published in Jefferson City, Missouri.

WEHCO Media owned the publication from April 2008 to December 2025.
