= Association for Education in Journalism and Mass Communication =

International membership organization

The Association for Education in Journalism and Mass Communication (AEJMC) is a major international membership organization for academics in the field, offering regional and national conferences and refereed publications. It has numerous membership divisions, interest groups, publications and websites. It is registered as a nonprofit 501(c)(3) organization based in Columbia, South Carolina, operating with tax-exempt status as of August, 1952.

== Focus ==
In the United States, many university journalism departments—particularly at Midwestern, Western and Southern state universities—evolved into schools or colleges of mass communication or "journalism and mass communication". In addition to studying practical skills of journalism, public relations or advertising, students also may major in "mass communication" or "mass communication research". The latter is often the title given to doctoral degrees from such schools, whether the focus of the student's research is journalism practice, media economics, history, law or media influence.

Departmental structures within such colleges may separate research and instruction in professional or technical aspects of newspaper and magazine publishing, radio, television, and film. Mass communication research topics include media institutions and processes, such as diffusion of information, and media effects, such as persuasion or manipulation of public opinion. Outside of media history and communication law, research methods in mass communication fields have leaned toward empirical research, experimental studies and quantitative methods, such as public opinion polling and content analysis of news media. However, qualitative research, including ethnographic case studies, interviewing, and focus groups, has growing support in some specialties. Critical-cultural theory is less popular than in other "communication studies" programs.

Such programs are accredited by the ACEJMC Accrediting Council on Education in Journalism and Mass Communications.

The International Communication Association (ICA) and National Communication Association (formerly the Speech Communication Association) include divisions and publications that overlap with those of AEJMC, but AEJMC historically has stronger ties to the mass communication professions in the United States.

== Publications ==
Its major journal, Journalism & Mass Communication Quarterly was formerly titled Journalism Quarterly. It also publishes the quarterly, refereed Journalism & Mass Communication Educator, formerly Journalism Educator, and the refereed Journalism & Communication Monographs, formerly Journalism Monographs.

The current editor of Journalism & Mass Communication Quarterly is Louisa Ha of Bowling Green State University. The current editor of Journalism & Mass Communication Educator is Jami A. Fullerton, of Oklahoma State University. The current editor of Journalism & Communication Monographs is Linda Steiner of the University of Maryland.

== See also ==
- Center for Intercultural Dialogue
