= Cynthia Carter =

British media academic

- Born: 30 January 1959 (age 67)

Academic background
- Education: University of Wales

Academic work
- Main interests: Children, news, journalism and citizenship
- Notable works: News, gender and power (Routledge)

Cynthia Carter (born 30 January 1959) is a Reader in the School of Journalism, Media and Culture, Cardiff University, and co-founding editor of the journal Feminist Media Studies.

She has been the guest editor of a special "Gendered News" issue of Journalism: Theory, Practice and Criticism, and, along with Stephanie Hemelryk Donald, she was co-guest editor of a special "Children, Media and Conflict" issue of the Journal of Children and Media.

Carter was the chair of the Feminist Scholarship Division of the International Communication Association between 2003 and 2005.

== Publications ==
=== Books ===
- Carter, Cynthia; Branston, Gill; Allan, Stuart (1998). News, gender, and power. London New York: Routledge. ISBN 978-0-415-17016-1.
- Carter, Cynthia; Adam, Barbara E.; Allan, Stuart (2000). Environmental risks and the media. London New York: Routledge. ISBN 978-0-415-21447-6.
- Carter, Cynthia; Weaver, C. Kay (2003). Violence and the media. Buckingham, England Philadelphia, Pennsylvania: Open University Press. ISBN 978-0-335-20505-9.
- Carter, Cynthia; Steiner, Linda (2004). Critical readings: media and gender. Maidenhead: Open University Press. ISBN 978-0-335-21097-8.
- Carter, Cynthia; Weaver, C. Kay (2006). Critical readings: violence and the media. Maidenhead, England New York: Open University Press. ISBN 978-0-335-21805-9.
- Carter, Cynthia; McLaughlin, Lisa (2013). Current perspectives in feminist media studies. London New York: Routledge. ISBN 978-0-415-54011-7.
- Carter, Cynthia; Steiner, Linda; McLaughlin, Lisa (2015). The Routledge companion to media & gender. London New York: Routledge. ISBN 978-1-138-84912-9.
- Allan, Stuart; Carter, Cynthia; Cushion, Stephen; Dencik, Lina; Garcia-Blanco, Inaki; Harris, Janet; Sambrook, Richard; Williams, Andy; Wahl-Jorgensen, Karin (2018). The future of journalism: risks, threats and opportunities. London New York: Routledge. ISBN 978-1-138-61649-3.

=== Book chapters ===
- Carter, Cynthia (2006), "The transformative power of cultural criticism: bell hooks' radical media analysis", in Berry, David; Theobald, John (eds.), Radical mass media criticism: a cultural genealogy, Montreal New York: Black Rose Books, pp. 212–233, ISBN 978-1-55164-246-8. Pdf.
- Carter, Cynthia; Mendes, Kaitlynn (2008), "Feminist and gender studies", in Donsbach, Wolfgang (ed.), The international encyclopedia of communication, Volume IV: digital imagery – fictional media content, Malden, Massachusetts: Blackwell Publishers, ISBN 978-1-4051-3199-5.
- Carter, Cynthia; Zayyan, Heba (2009), "Human rights and wrongs: blogging news of everyday life in Palestine", in Allan, Stuart; Thorsen, Einar (eds.), Volume 1: Citizen journalism: global perspectives, Global Crises and the Media, New York: Peter Lang, pp. 85–94, ISBN 978-1-4331-0295-0. Pdf.
- Carter, Cynthia; Allan, Stuart (2009), "The visual culture of television news", in Howells, Richard; Matson, Robert (eds.), Using visual evidence, Maidenhead, UK: Open University Press/McGraw-Hill, pp. 139–152, ISBN 978-0-335-22864-5.
- Carter, Cynthia; Allan, Stuart; Thorsen, Einar (2010), "Citizenship and public service: the case of BBC news online", in Tunney, Sean; Monaghan, Garrett (eds.), Web journalism: a new form of citizenship?, Eastbourne Portland, Oregon: Sussex Academic Press, pp. 116–125, ISBN 978-1-84519-279-2.
- Carter, Cynthia; Messenger Davies, Máire; Mendes, Kaitlynn (2012), "Young citizens and the news", in Allan, Stuart (ed.), The Routledge companion to news and journalism, London New York: Routledge, pp. 450–459, ISBN 978-0-415-66953-5.
- Carter, Cynthia (2012), "Sex/gender and the media: from sex roles to social construction and beyond", in Ross, Karen (ed.), The handbook of gender, sex, and media, Handbooks in Communication and Media, Malden: Wiley-Blackwell, pp. 365–382, ISBN 978-1-4443-3854-6. Pdf.
- Carter, Cynthia (2013), "Children and news: rethinking citizenship in the twenty-first century", in Lemish, Dafna (ed.), The Routledge international handbook of children, adolescents and media, London New York: Routledge, pp. 255–262, ISBN 978-0-415-78368-2.
- Carter, Cynthia (2014), "News media and child well-being", in Ben-Arieh, Asher; Casas, Ferran; Frones, Ivar; Korbin, Jill E. (eds.), Handbook of child well-being: theories, methods and policies in global perspective, Netherlands: Springer, pp. 1979–2011, ISBN 978-90-481-9062-1.
- Carter, Cynthia; Messenger Davies, Máire; Allan, Stuart; Mendes, Kaitlynn (2014), "News, children and citizenship: user-generated content and the BBC's Newsround website", in Popple, Simon; Thornham, Helen (eds.), Content cultures: transformations of user generated content in public service broadcasting, London New York: I.B. Tauris, pp. 15–40, ISBN 978-1-78076-513-6.
- Carter, Cynthia (2014), "Online popular anti-sexism political action in the UK and USA: the importance of collaborative anger for social change", in Carter, Cynthia; Steiner, Linda; McLaughlin, Lisa (eds.), The Routledge companion to media & gender, London New York: Routledge, pp. 643–653, ISBN 978-1-138-84912-9.
- Carter, Cynthia (2017), "The role of news media in fostering children's democratic citizenship", in Waisbord, Silvio; Tumber, Howard (eds.), Routledge companion to media and human rights, London New York: Routledge, pp. 416–425, ISBN 978-1-138-66554-5.

=== Journal articles ===
- Carter, Cynthia; McLaughlin, Lisa (2001). "Editors' introduction". Feminist Media Studies. 1 (1): 5–10. doi:10.1080/14680770120042765. S2CID 216643910.
- Carter, Cynthia; McLaughlin, Lisa (2003). "Locating gender". Feminist Media Studies. 3 (1): 5–10. doi:10.1080/1468077032000080095. S2CID 216643677.
- Carter, Cynthia; Ross, Karen (2004). "A woman's place? Gender and culture in higher education". Knowledge, Work and Society/Savoir, Travail et Société. 2 (3): 95–115.
- Carter, Cynthia; Allan, Stuart (2005). "Public service and the market: a case study of the BBC's Newsround website". Intervention Research. 1 (2): 209–225. doi:10.3233/IVR-2005-00013.
- Carter, Cynthia (August 2005). "Gendered news?". Journalism: Theory, Practice & Criticism. 6 (3): 259–263. doi:10.1177/1464884905054060. S2CID 220900556.
- Carter, Cynthia; Donald, Stephanie Hemelryk (2008). "Editors' introduction: children, media and conflict". Journal of Children and Media. 2 (3): 197–199. doi:10.1080/17482790802327350. S2CID 142662415.
- Carter, Cynthia (January 2009) [2008]. "Growing up corporate: news, citizenship, and young people today". Television & New Media. 10 (1): 34–36. doi:10.1177/1527476408325733. S2CID 144045243.
- Carter, Cynthia; et al. (2008). "Gender in children's television worldwide". TelevIZIon 21. 21.
- Carter, Cynthia; Donald, Stephanie Hemelryk (2008). "Editors' introduction: children, media and conflict". Journal of Children and Media. 2 (3): 197–199. doi:10.1080/17482790802327350. S2CID 142662415.
- Carter, Cynthia; Mendes, Kaitlynn (November 2008). "Feminist and gender media studies: a critical overview". Sociology Compass. 2 (6): 1701–1718. doi:10.1111/j.1751-9020.2008.00158.x.
- Carter, Cynthia; et al. (2010). "Evidence into practice: evaluating a child-centred intervention for diabetes medicine management The EPIC Project". BMC Pediatrics. 10 (70) 70: 1471–2431. doi:10.1186/1471-2431-10-70. PMC 2955672. PMID 20875112.
- Carter, Cynthia; McLaughlin, Lisa (2011). "Editors' introduction: the tenth anniversary issue of Feminist Media Studies". Feminist Media Studies. 11 (1): 1–5. doi:10.1080/14680777.2011.540803. S2CID 146719614.
- Carter, Cynthia; Ross, Karen (November 2011). "Women and news: A long and winding road". Media, Culture & Society. 33 (8): 1148–1165. doi:10.1177/0163443711418272. S2CID 144205131.
- Carter, Cynthia; et al. (March 2014). "Developing and evaluating a child-centred intervention for diabetes medicine management using mixed methods and a multicentre randomised controlled trial". Health Services and Delivery Research. 2 (8): 1–441. doi:10.3310/hsdr02080. PMID 25642573.
- Jia, Sen; Lansdall-Welfare, Thomas; Sudhahar, Saatviga; Carter, Cynthia; Christianini, Nello (2016). "Women are seen more than heard in online newspapers". PLOS ONE. 11 (2) e0148434. Bibcode:2016PLoSO..1148434J. doi:10.1371/journal.pone.0148434. PMC 4740422. PMID 26840432.url = https://doi.org/10.1371/journal.pone.0148434
- Ross, Karen; Boyle, Karen; Carter, Cynthia; Ging, Debbie (2016). "Women, men and news: 'it's life Jim, but not as we know it'". Journalism Studies. 19 (6): 824–845. doi:10.1080/1461670X.2016.1222884. hdl:1893/24401. S2CID 151305223.

== See also ==
- Linda Steiner
