= Texarkana Gazette =

Daily newspaper in Texarkana, Arkansas

The Texarkana Gazette

- Texarkana Gazette front page from December 30, 2006, reporting the Execution of Saddam Hussein
- Type: Daily newspaper
- Format: Broadsheet
- Owner: WEHCO Media, Inc.
- General manager: James Bright
- Founded: 1875
- Language: English
- Headquarters: 101 E. Broad St., Texarkana, Arkansas
- Circulation: 2,476 (as of 2023)
- Website: texarkanagazette.com

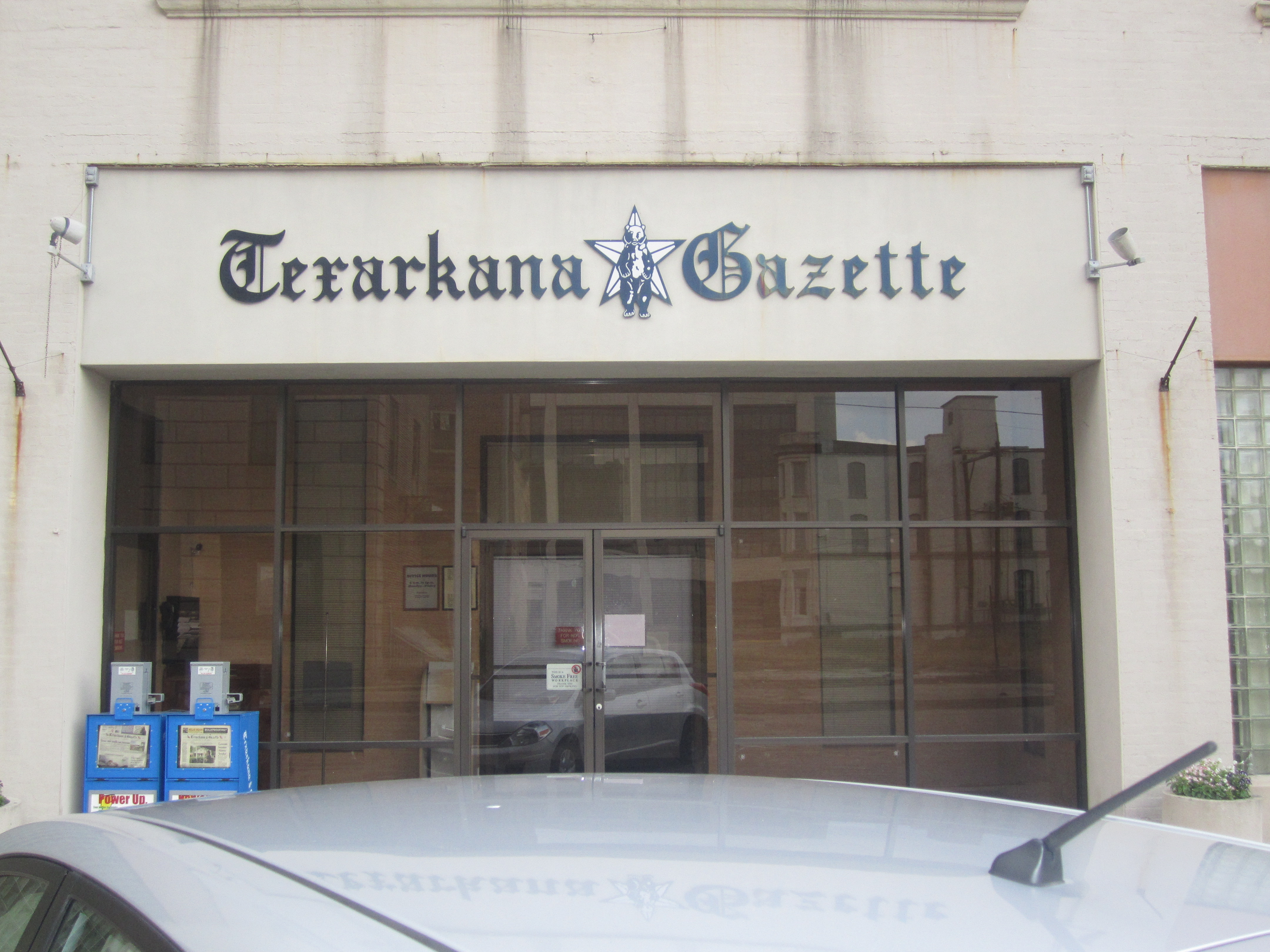
Texarkana Gazette building in Texarkana, Texas

The Texarkana Gazette is a daily newspaper founded in 1875 and currently owned by WEHCO Media, Inc. It serves a nine-county area surrounding Texarkana.

== History ==
The previous afternoon daily, the Texarkana Daily News, ceased publication in 1978. Rodger Dean Duncan, who later worked for two White House administrations and then as a prominent business consultant, was managing editor of the two Texarkana newspapers in the late 1960s.

The paper earned the coveted 2010 General Excellence award from the Arkansas Press Association, competing against eight other large dailies, including the Arkansas Democrat-Gazette, which placed second.

For more than 85 years, the main office of the Gazette was located at 315 Pine Street on the Texas side. In September 2016, the Gazette's business, circulation, advertising, creative services, and editorial departments moved to the first two floors of the Landmark Building at 101 E. Broad St. on the Arkansas side, while the printing and distribution remained in the existing building.

On December 12, 2017, the paper announced that it would close its Texarkana printing press in mid-January and begin printing in Little Rock, Arkansas, where sister paper the Arkansas Democrat-Gazette is printed.

== Controversy ==
In September 2013, the paper and editor Les Minor generated controversy when it refused to publish the wedding announcement of a gay couple. "The Texarkana Gazette publishes wedding, engagement and anniversary announcements related to marriages or impending marriages that are recognized by states in which it circulates," Minor said.
