= Feminist Media Studies =

- Discipline: Media studies, communication studies
- Language: English
- Edited by: Lisa McLaughlin, Cynthia Carter, Radha S. Hegde

Publication details
- History: 2001–present
- Publisher: Routledge
- Frequency: Bimonthly
- Impact factor: 2.1 (2025)

Standard abbreviations
- ISO 4: Fem. Media Stud.

Indexing
- ISSN: 1468-0777 (print); 1471-5902 (web)
- LCCN: 2001260221
- OCLC no.: 610423699

Links
- Journal homepage; Online access; Online archive

Feminist Media Studies is a peer-reviewed academic journal covering media and communication studies from a feminist perspective. Established in March 2001, United Kingdom publisher Routledge publishes eight issues a year. This journal advocates for original submissions based on the social experiences of society and the intersectionality of feminism. The editors-in-chief are Cynthia Carter (Cardiff University) and Isabel Molina-Guzmán (University of Illinois, Urbana-Champaign). The journal has over 400,000 downloads and views each year, and invites contributions from all fields, whether related to communications or not.

== Abstracting and indexing ==
The journal is abstracted and indexed in Communication Abstracts, Communication and Mass Media Complete, Index Islamicus, International Bibliography of the Social Sciences, and the MLA International Bibliography.

According to the Journal Citation Reports, the journal has a 2025 impact factor of 2.1. According to Scopus, the journal has a CiteScore of 4.9, ranking 13 out of 697 in the category "Visual Arts and Performing Arts", 23 out of 233 in the category "Gender Studies" and 82 out of 541 in the category "Communication".
