= Signature =

Mark made as a proof of identity and intent

John Hancock's signature is the most prominent on the United States Declaration of Independence and the Articles of Confederation. The name "John Hancock" or just "Hancock" has become a synonym for "signature" in the United States.

A signature (/ˈsɪɡnɪtʃər, ˈsɪɡnətʃər/; from Latin: signare, "to sign") is a depiction of someone's name, nickname, or some other mark that a person writes on documents as a proof of identity and intent. Signatures are often, but not always, handwritten or stylized. The writer of a signature is a signatory or signer. A signature may be confused with an autograph, which is chiefly an artistic signature. This can lead to confusion when people have both an autograph and signature and as such some people in the public eye keep their signatures private whilst fully publishing their autograph.

== Function and types ==
=== Identification ===
Signature of Benjamin Franklin (1706–1790)

Signature of Empress Farah Pahlavi of Iran (1938–) in Persian handwriting

Signature of Sava I of Serbia (1169/1174–1236), the first Archbishop of Serbia, in the Cyrillic alphabet. Here, the letters А and В are combined into a single digraph

The traditional function of a signature is to permanently affix to a document a person's uniquely personal, undeniable self-identification as physical evidence of that person's personal witness and certification of the content of all, or a specified part, of the document. For example, the role of a signature in many consumer contracts is not solely to provide evidence of the identity of the contracting party, but also to provide evidence of deliberation and informed consent.

In the United States, signatures encompass marks and actions of all sorts that are indicative of identity and intent. The legal rule is that unless a statute specifically prescribes a particular method of making a signature it may be made in any number of ways. These include by a mechanical or rubber stamp facsimile. A signature may be made by the purported signatory; alternatively someone else duly authorized by the signatory, acting in their presence and at their direction, may make the signature.

Many individuals have much more fanciful signatures than their normal cursive writing, including elaborate ascenders, descenders and exotic flourishes, much as one would find in calligraphic writing. As an example, the final "k" in John Hancock's famous signature on the US Declaration of Independence loops back to underline his name. This kind of flourish is also known as a paraph, a French term meaning flourish, initial or signature. The paraph is used in graphology analyses.

Several cultures whose languages use writing systems other than alphabets do not share the Western notion of signatures per se: the "signing" of one's name results in a written product no different from the result of "writing" one's name in the standard way. For these languages, to write or to sign involves the same written characters.

=== Mark in lieu of signature ===
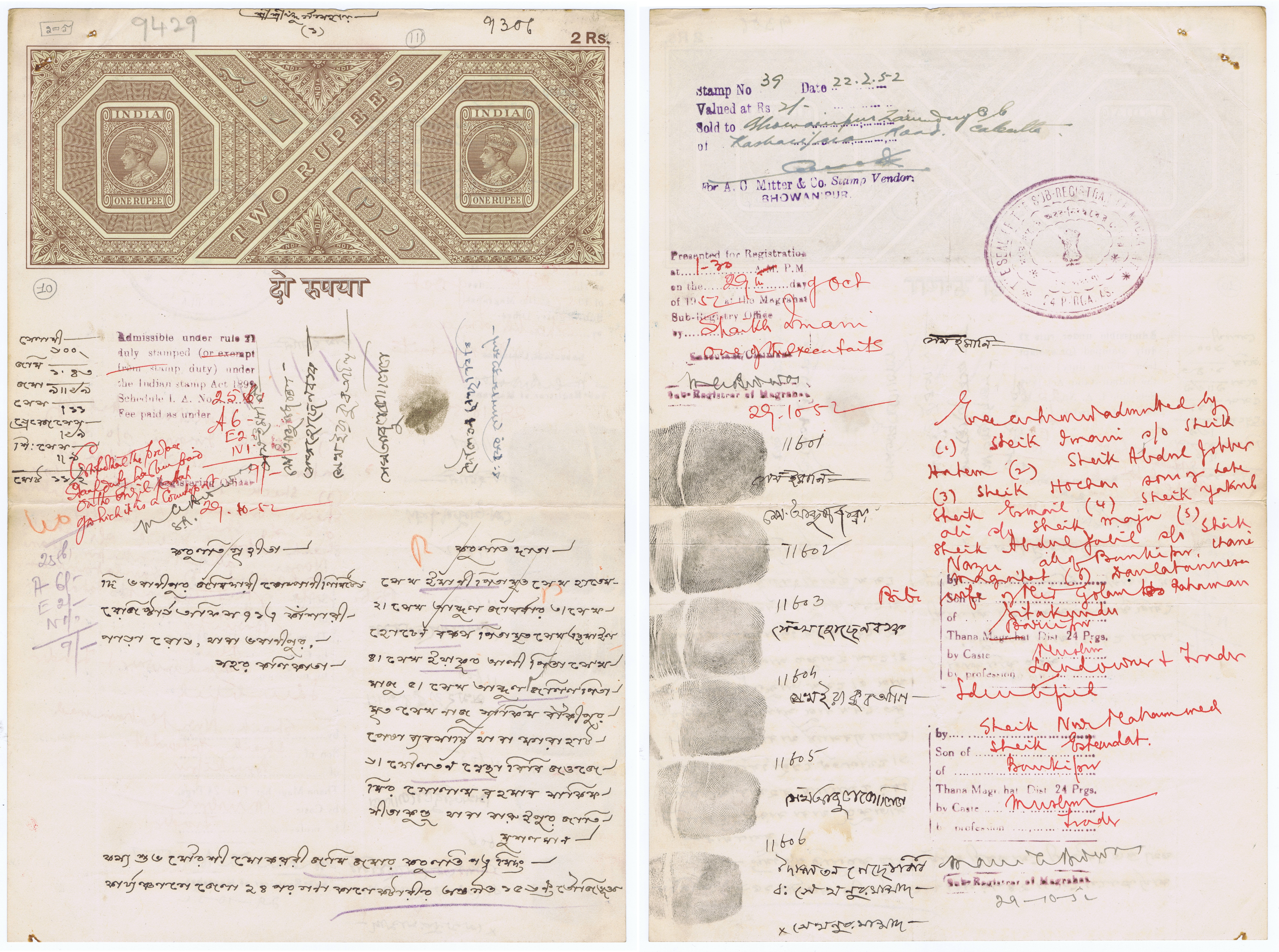
Fingerprints may be used instead of signatures where the signer is illiterate, such as this Indian legal document from 1952

In some jurisdictions, an illiterate signatory can make a "mark" (often an "X" but occasionally a personalized symbol) on legal documents, so long as the document is countersigned by a literate witness. Courts in England and Wales are generally likely to recognise such a mark as legally valid. In some countries, illiterate people place a thumbprint on legal documents in lieu of a written signature.

=== Mechanically produced signatures ===
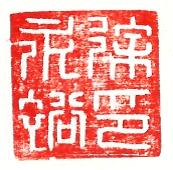
徐永裕印; Xú Yǒngyù yìn, rotating character seal of Xú Yǒngyù

Special signature machines, called autopens, are capable of automatically reproducing an individual's signature. These are typically used by people required to sign a lot of printed matter, such as celebrities, heads of state or CEOs. More recently, Members of Congress in the United States have begun having their signature made into a TrueType font file. This allows staff members in the Congressman's office to easily reproduce it on correspondence, legislation, and official documents. In the East Asian languages of Chinese, Japanese, and Korean, people traditionally use stamp-like objects known as name-seals with the name carved in tensho script (seal script) in lieu of a handwritten signature.

=== Wet signatures ===
A wet signature is a person's name written in their own hand with ink. Some government agencies require that professional persons or official reviewers sign originals and all copies of originals to authenticate that they personally viewed the content. In many countries, signatures must be made, witnessed and recorded in the presence of a notary public to carry legal force in specific contexts. In the United States this is prevalent with architectural and construction plans.

=== Online usage ===
In e-mail and newsgroup usage, another type of signature exists which is independent of one's language. Users can set one or more lines of custom text known as a signature block to be automatically appended to their messages. This text usually includes a name, contact information, and sometimes quotations and ASCII art. A shortened form of a signature block, only including one's name, often with some distinguishing prefix, can be used to simply indicate the end of a post or response. Some web sites also allow graphics to be used. Note, however, that this type of signature is not related to electronic signatures or digital signatures, which are more technical in nature and not directly understandable by humans.

=== Pre-signed signature pages ===
For guidance applicable in England and Wales on the use of pre-signed signature pages being subsequently attached to documents to effect a "virtual" signing, see Law of Property (Miscellaneous Provisions) Act 1989#Validity of execution under Mercury.

== Detection of forged signatures ==
Handwriting experts say "it is extremely difficult for anyone to be able to figure out if a signature or other very limited writing sample has been forged." High volume review of signatures, to decide if a signature is true or forged, occurs when election offices decide whether to accept absentee ballots arriving from voters, and possibly when banks decide whether to pay checks. The highest error rates in signature verification are found with lay people, higher than for computers, which in turn make more errors than experts.

Genuine signatures can exhibit substantial variation because signature production is a neuromuscular behavior influenced by factors such as writing conditions and the circumstances of execution. Consequently, forensic examination generally considers a range of variation across multiple known signatures rather than expecting genuine signatures to be identical.

There have been concerns that signature reviews improperly reject ballots from young and minority voters at higher rates than others, with no or limited ability of voters to appeal the rejection. When errors are made with bank checks, the payer can ask the bank for corrections.

In 2018, a fifth of adults in the United Kingdom said they sign so rarely they have no consistent signature, including 21% of people 18-24 and 16% of people over age 55. 55% of UK adults said they rarely sign anything.

Researchers have published error rates for computerized signature verification. They compare different systems on a common database of true and false signatures. The best system falsely rejects 10% of true signatures, while it accepts 10% of forgeries. Another system has error rates on both of 14%, and the third-best has error rates of 17%. It is possible to be less stringent and reject fewer true signatures, at the cost of also rejecting fewer forgeries. Computer algorithms:

look for a certain number of points of similarity between the compared signatures ... a wide range of algorithms and standards, each particular to that machine's manufacturer, are used to verify signatures. In addition, counties have discretion in managing the settings and implementing manufacturers' guidelines ... there are no statewide standards for automatic signature verification ... most counties do not have a publicly available, written explanation of the signature verification criteria and processes they use.

In an experiment, experts rejected 5% of true signatures and 71% of forgeries. They were doubtful about another 57% of true signatures and 27% of forgeries. If computer verification is adjusted to reflect what experts are sure about, it will wrongly reject 5% of true signatures and wrongly accept 29% of forgeries. If computers were adjusted more strictly, rejecting all signatures which experts have doubts about, the computers would set aside 62% of true signatures, and still wrongly accept 2% of forgeries. Lay people made more mistakes and were doubtful less often, though the study does not report whether their mistakes were to accept more forgeries or reject more true signatures.

Voters with short names are at a disadvantage, since experts make more mistakes on signatures with fewer "turning points and intersections." Participants in this study had 10 true signatures to compare to, which is more than most postal ballot verifications have. A more recent study for the US Department of Justice confirms the probabilistic nature of signature verification, though it does not provide numbers.

== Art ==
Vermeer's signature

The signature on a painting or other work of art is an important factor in assessing provenance. Fake signatures are sometimes added to enhance the value of a painting, or are added to a fake painting to support its authenticity. A notorious case was the signature of Johannes Vermeer on the fake "Supper at Emmaus" made by the art forger Han van Meegeren. However, the fact that painters' signatures often vary over time (particularly in the modern and contemporary periods) might complicate the issue. The signatures of some painters take on an artistic form that may be of less value in determining forgeries.

If a painting is abstract or ambiguous, the signature may be the only clue to determine which side is up.

== Copyright ==
Under British law, the appearance of signatures (not the names themselves) may be protected under copyright law.

Under United States copyright law, "titles, names [I c...]; mere variations of typographic ornamentation, lettering, or coloring" are not eligible for copyright; however, the appearance of signatures (not the names themselves) may be protected under copyright law.

== Uniform Commercial Code ==
Uniform Commercial Code §1-201(37) of the United States generally defines signed as "using any symbol executed or adopted with present intention to adopt or accept a writing". The Uniform Commercial Code §3-401(b) for negotiable instruments states "A signature may be made (i) manually or by means of a device or machine, and (ii) by the use of any name, including a trade or assumed name, or by a word, mark, or symbol executed or adopted by a person with present intention to authenticate a writing."

== See also ==
- Autograph club
- Autograph Collector Magazine
- Biometric signature as form of the electronic signature
- Builder's signature
- Initials
- Images of signatures
- manu propria (m.p.)
- Memorial to the 56 Signers of the Declaration of Independence, includes depicted signatures
- Monogram
- Pawtograph, an animal's paw print
- Round robin, a signed document where the signatures are arranged in a circle
- Royal sign-manual
- Shakespeare's handwriting
- Signum manus
- Tughra
- Huaya
