= Autograph show =

Meeting of autograph collectors

An autograph show (or, alternatively, autograph meeting, autograph signing or autograph convention) is an event where the public, mostly autograph collectors or fans of an attending celebrity, gather to collect autographs from someone famous who attends to meet fans and sign items for them. Some autograph shows are part of a larger, comicon event, while others can be part of a specific event, such as the Super Bowl weeks' activities.

Celebrities from all walks of life attend shows, but usually these shows bring celebrity athletes, singers, movie stars and book authors to meet their fans.

These meetings are usually held at places such as convention centers, hotels, stadiums and stores. However, other venues, such as churches or sports gyms have also been used.

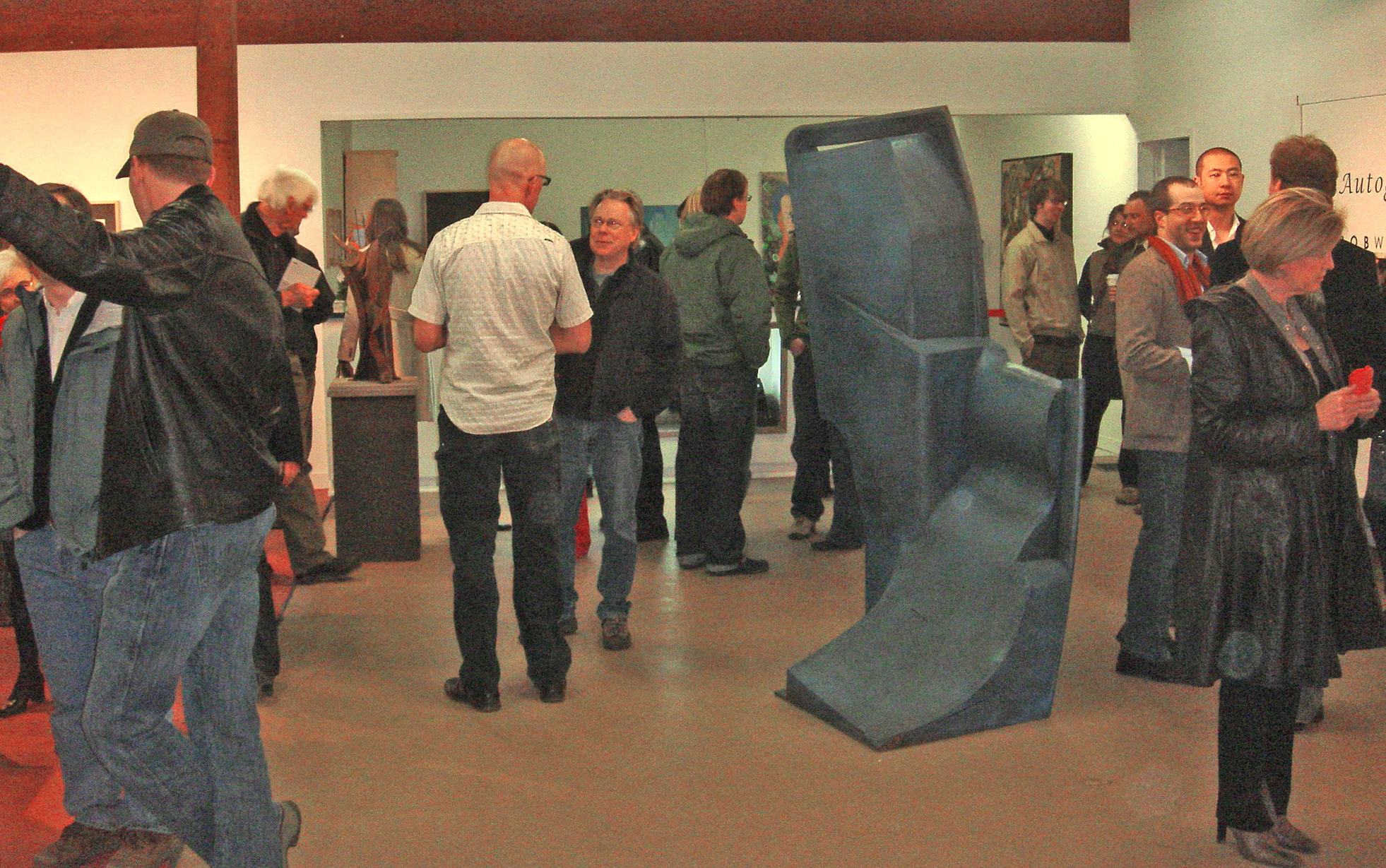
Fans at an autograph show

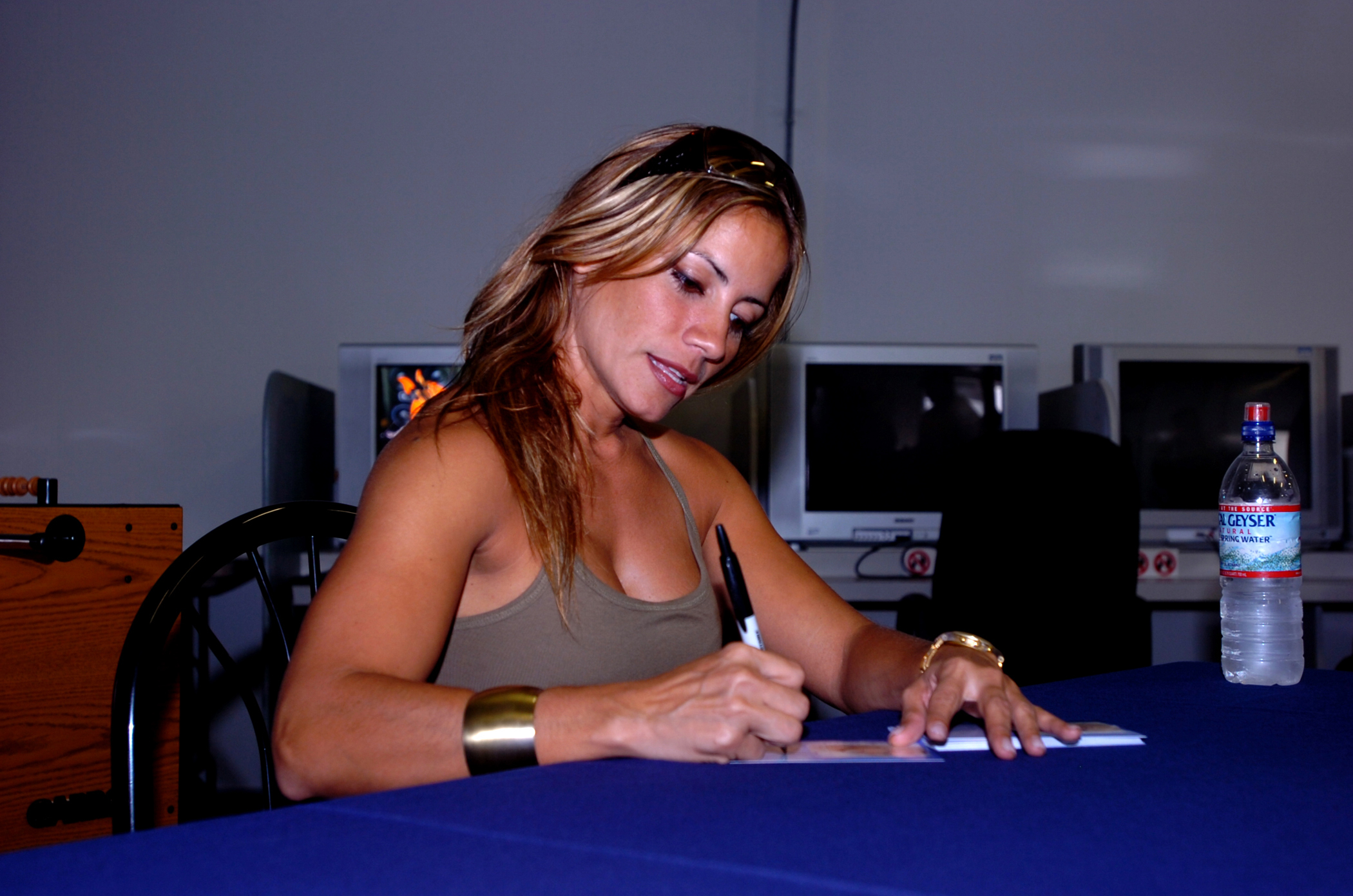
Puerto Rican singer Melina Leon at an autograph signing

== Economics ==
These shows can bring a new source of income to celebrities, as many of them charge for the signatures they give. Some entertainers charge organizers about $5,000 to $10,000 as fees for appearing. Such fees are then offset by the organizers by charging fans for the right to receive the celebrity or celebrities' autographs. Yet some other shows are completely free of charge. The latter are usually organized by a local sports team or entertainment venue that wants local fans to get acquainted with a celebrity who will play for the local team or who will appear at something the entertainment venue is about to offer.

In addition, book authors often do autograph shows to promote their newly released books.

== Conventions ==
There are many international autograph conventions, some of which last multiple days. These are popular in places such as the United States, the United Kingdom and elsewhere.

== Difference between autograph shows and some meet and greets ==
A major difference between autograph shows and meet and greet shows is that some meet and greet shows do not allow fans to ask celebrities for autographs.

== See also ==
- Autograph
- Autograph collecting
- Autograph Collector Magazine
