= Autograph =

Personal signature

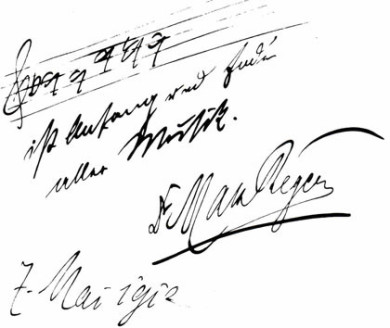
"B-A-C-H is beginning and end of all music", signed autograph document by Max Reger (dated 7 May 1912)

An autograph is a person's own handwriting or signature. The word autograph comes from Ancient Greek (αὐτός, autós, "self" and γράφω, gráphō, "write"), and can mean more specifically:

- a manuscript written by the author of its content. In this meaning the term autograph can often be used interchangeably with holograph.
- a celebrity's handwritten signature. Autograph collecting is the activity of collecting such autographs.

== History ==
Autograph of El Cid

The Schøyen Collection states that it holds the "world's oldest autograph signature", namely a clay tablet (Ms. 2429/4) from about 3100 BC in archaic Sumerian, which includes the name of the scribe Gar.Ama.

Whether an autograph of a major figure of antiquity survives is disputed: Some scholars, especially the American papyrologist Peter van Minnen, are of the opinion that Papyrus Bingen 45 (33 BC) contains a Greek word written by Cleopatra. The papyrus would thus contain the only surviving autograph of an important figure from antiquity.

More than a millennium later, an autograph of El Cid is known, dated 1098.

== Autograph manuscript ==
"Autograph" can refer to a document transcribed entirely in the handwriting of its author, as opposed to a typeset document or one written by an amanuensis or a copyist. This meaning overlaps that of "holograph".

== Celebrity's signature ==
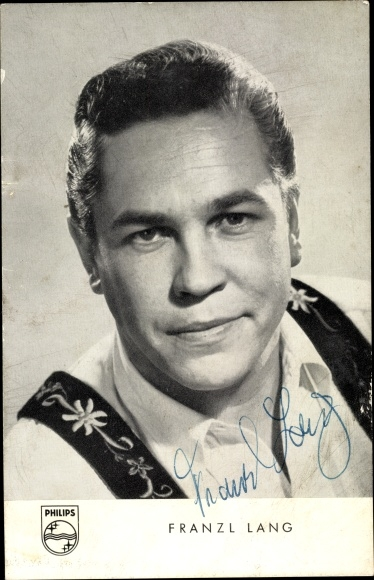
Picture of German yodeler Franzl Lang, autograph (likely for a fan's collection) at bottom.

Autograph collecting is the hobby of collecting autographs of famous persons. Some of the most popular categories of autograph subjects are presidents, military soldiers, athletes, movie stars, artists, social and religious leaders, scientists, astronauts, and authors.

== See also ==
- Asemic writing – Wordless open semantic form of writing
- Profiles in History – Auction house in Los Angeles, California
- Memorial to the 56 Signers of the Declaration of Independence, stone blocks with depicted signatures
- Autograph show – Meeting of autograph collectors
- Law of agency#Allograph – Person representing another person in legal matters, and the laws enabling this, specifically a signature made by an agent on behalf of a principal
