= Pawtograph =

Print of an animal's paw used as an autograph

A pawtograph is a print of an animal's paw, regarded in some contexts as equivalent to a human signature. This term is used in particular for the practice of collecting pawtographs of celebrity animals. The hobby of collecting pawtographs is known as pawtography.

A pawtograph is made by one of two methods:

1. directly stamping a paw on a stamp pad, then stamping the item to be autographed.
2. creating a rubber stamp from the paw impression and stamping the item using the stamp.
