= Autograph collecting =

Practice of collecting autographs of famous persons

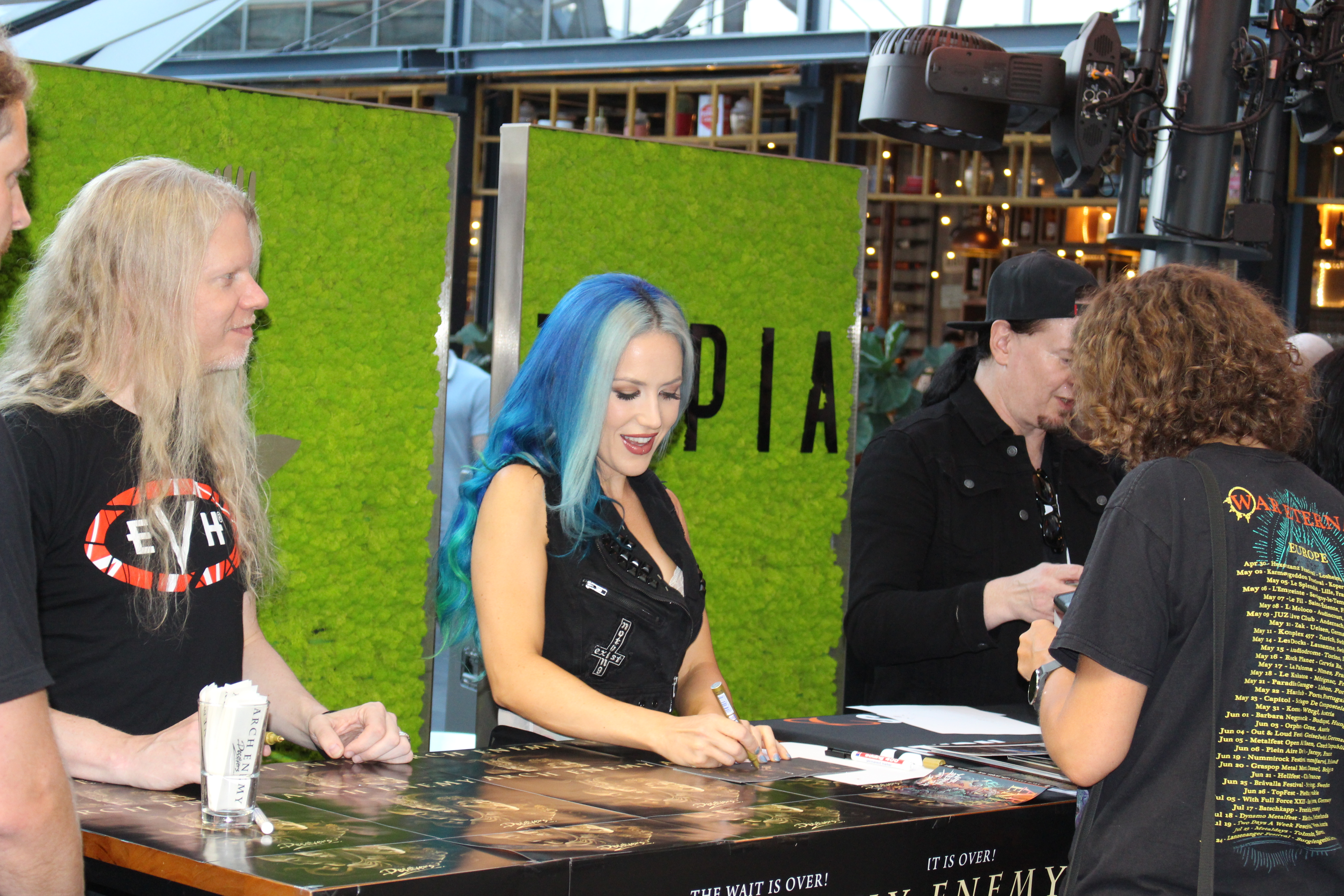
Arch Enemy signing autographs for fans in 2022

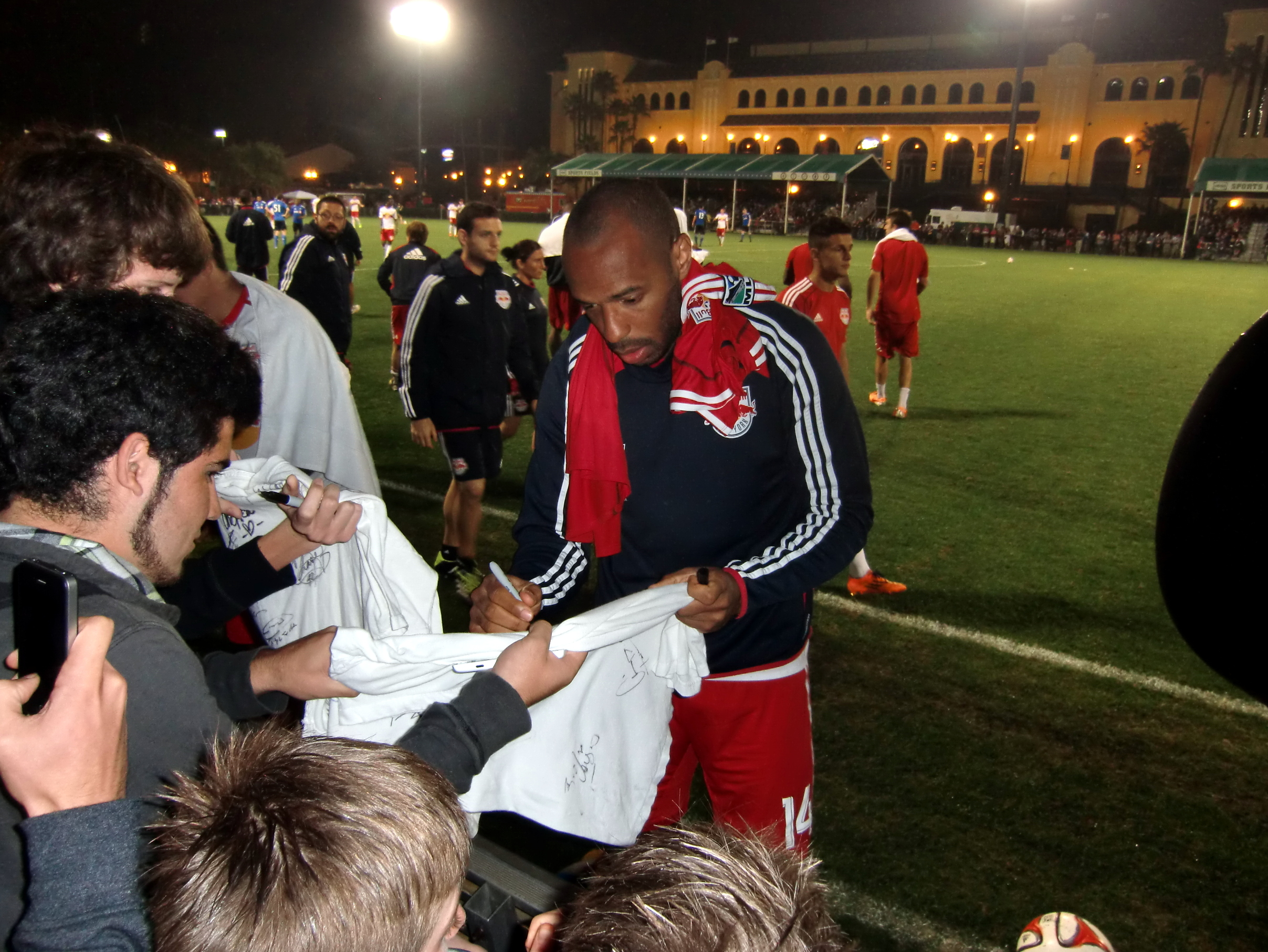
Thierry Henry signing autographs in 2014

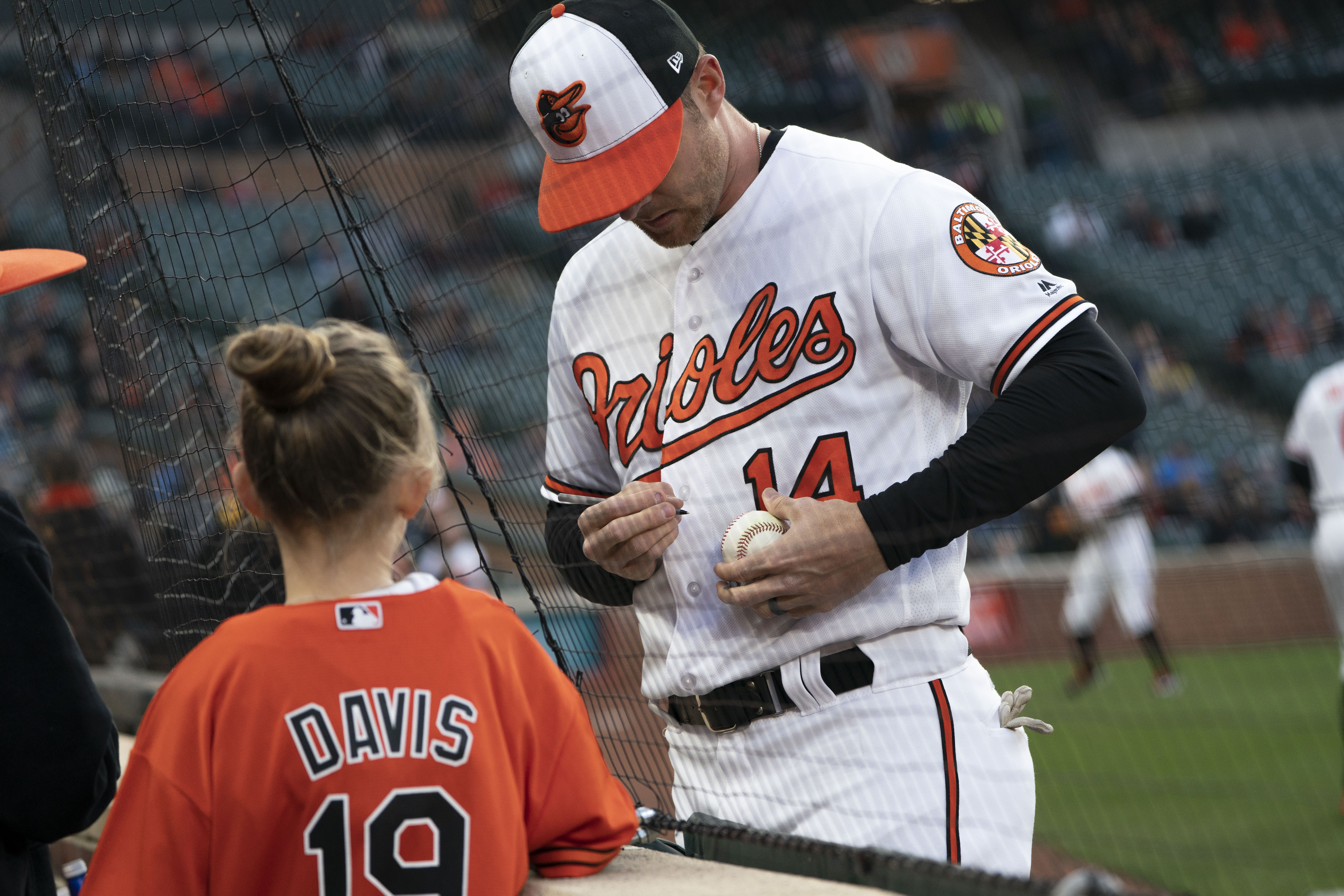
Baseball player Craig Gentry autographing a baseball for a young fan in 2018

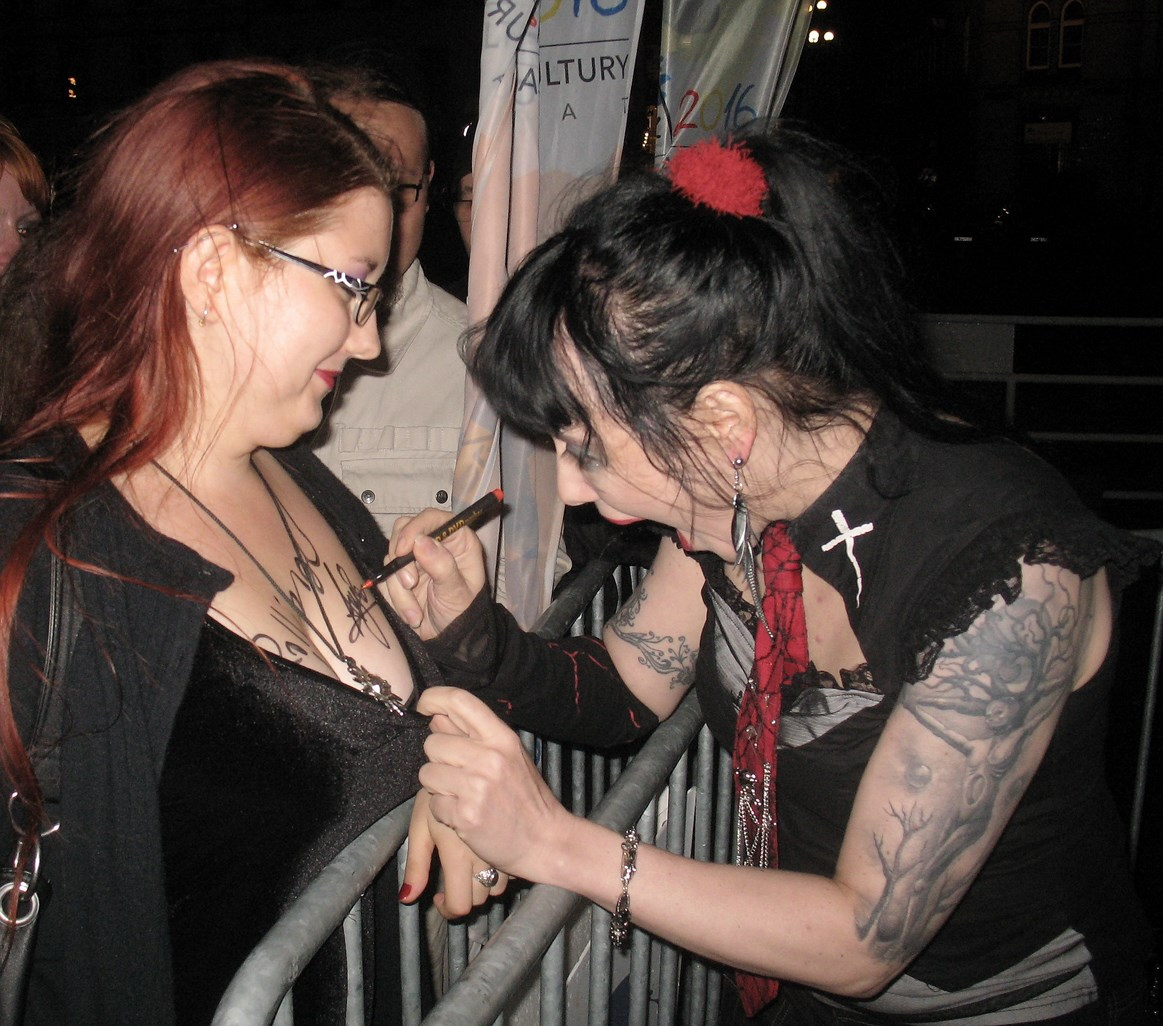
Singer Anja Orthodox autographing the body of one of her fans

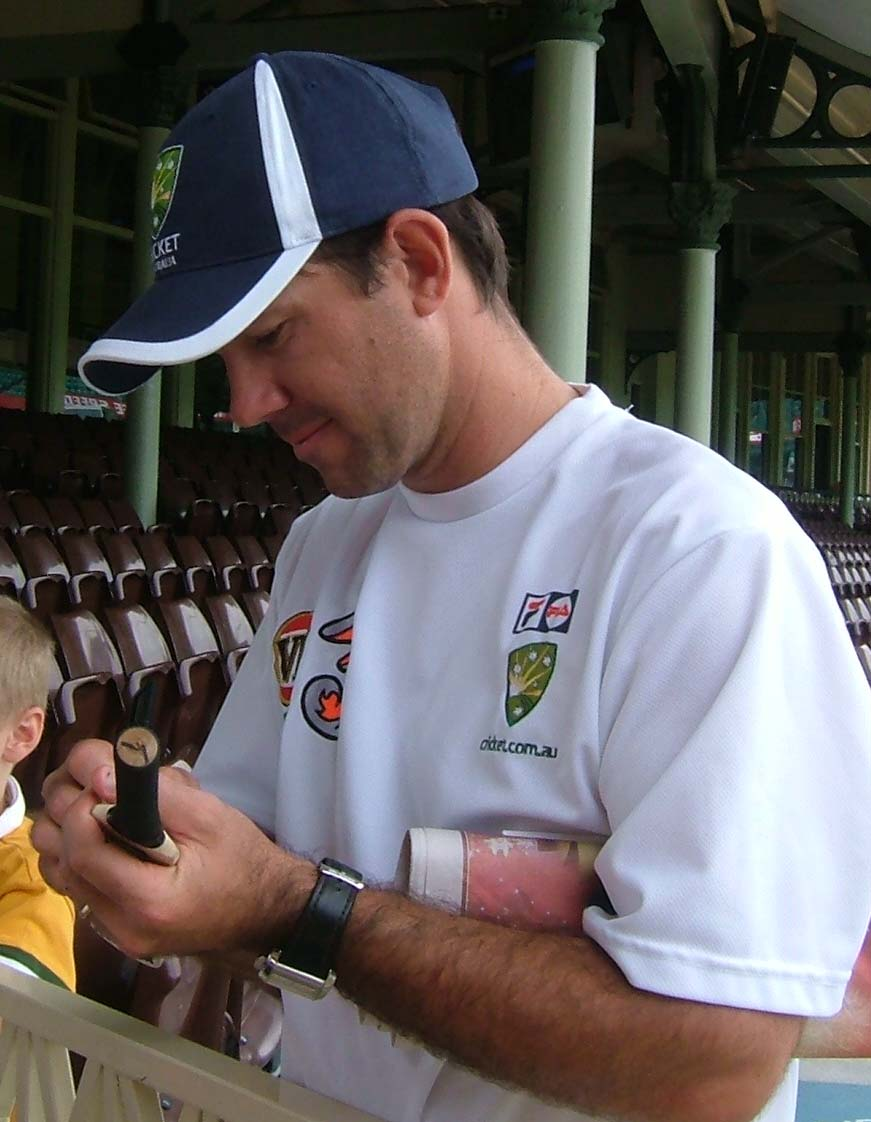
Ricky Ponting autographing a cricket bat for a fan in 2005

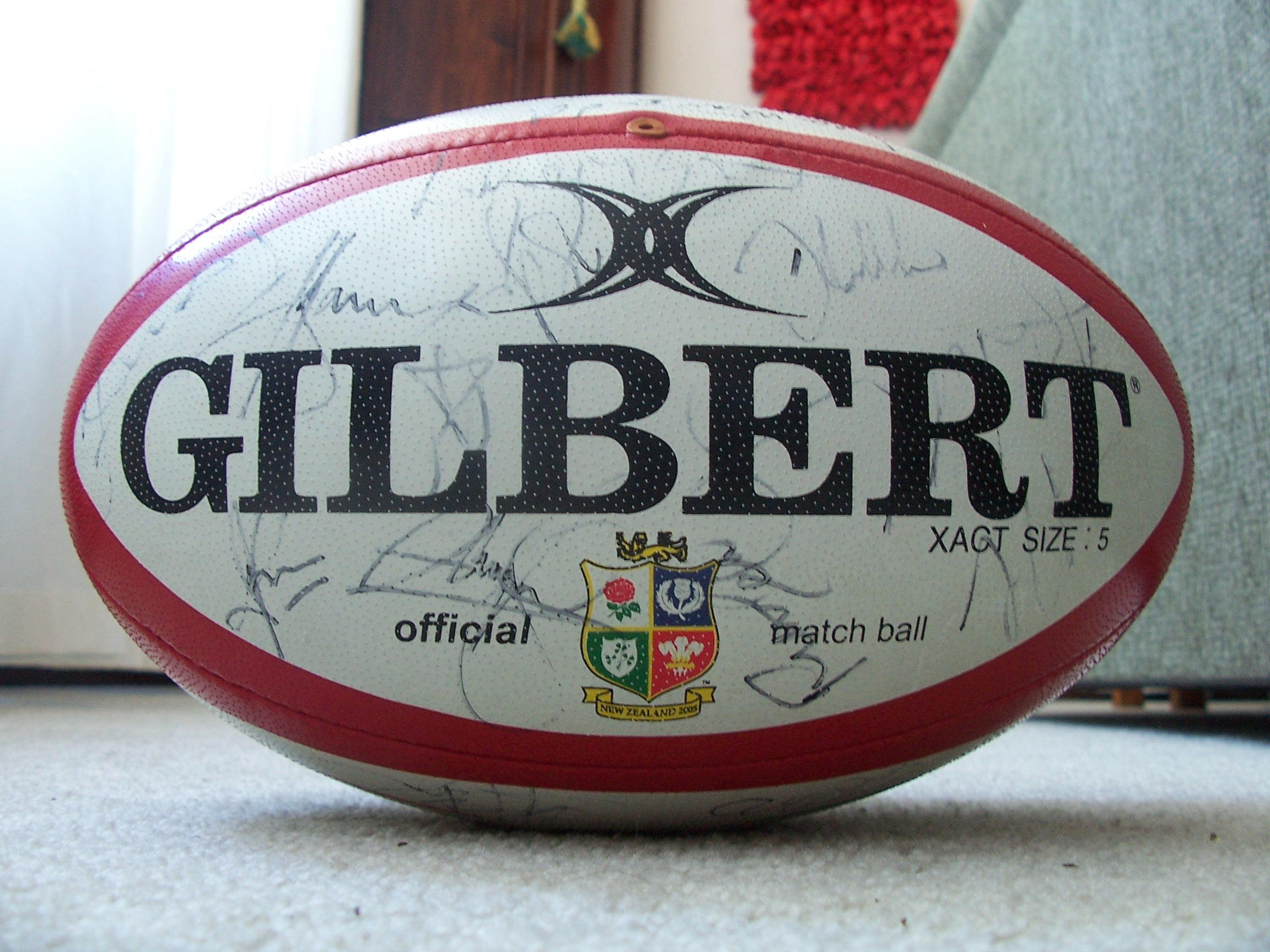
A rugby ball signed by all of the All Blacks 2006 Tri Nations Series squad

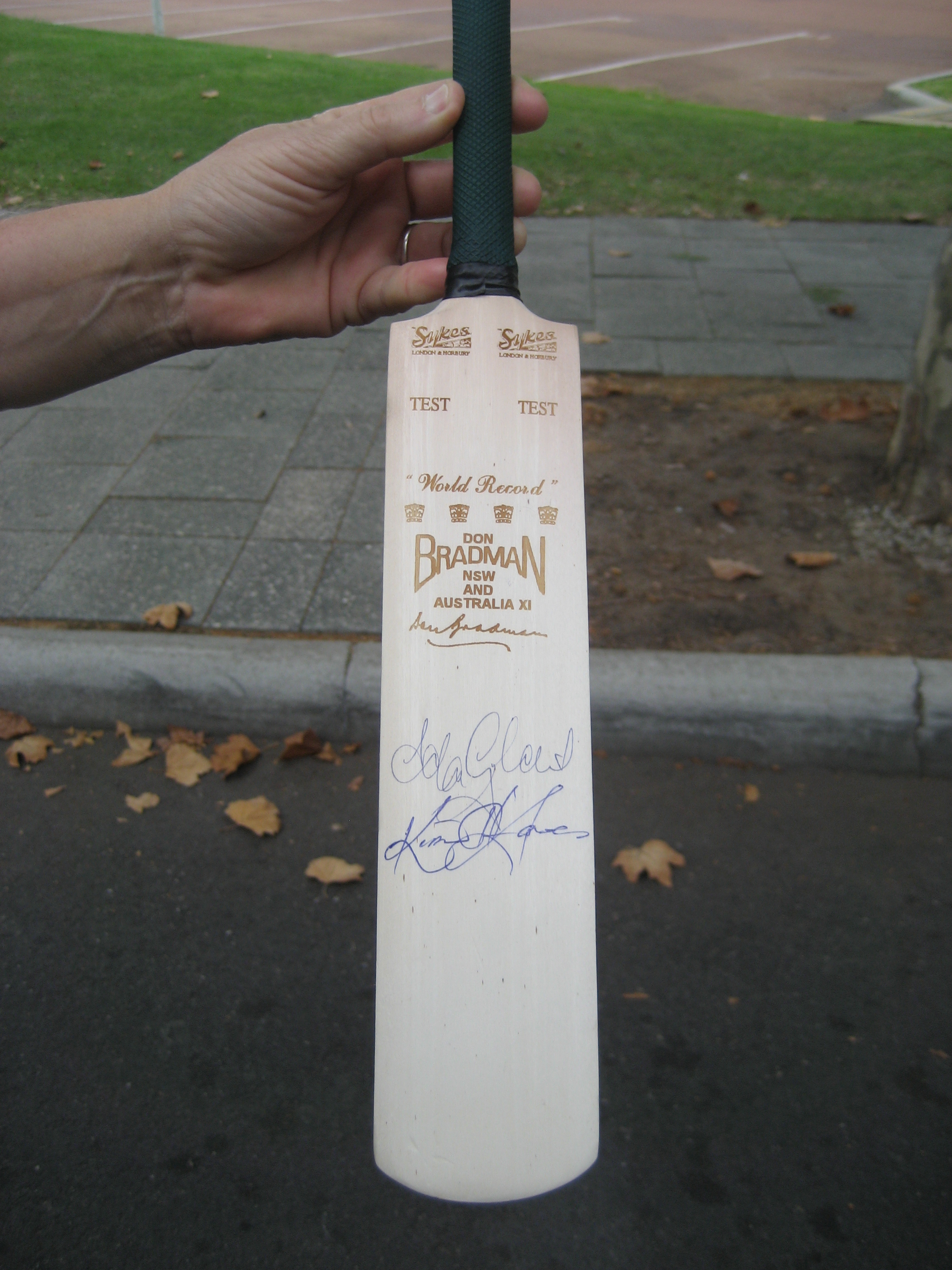
A cricket bat signed by Adam Gilchrist and Kim Hughes

Autograph collecting is the practice of collecting autographs of famous persons. Some of the most popular categories of autograph subjects are politicians, military soldiers, athletes, movie stars, artists, social and religious leaders, scientists, astronauts, and authors.

Some collectors may specialize in specific fields (such as Nobel Prize winners) or general topics (military leaders participating in World War I) or specific documents (e.g., signers of the Charter of the United Nations; signers of the U.S. Constitution; signers of the Israeli Declaration of Independence; signers of the Charter of the European Common Union; signers of the World War II German or Japanese surrender documents).

Collecting autographs may be in decline with fans preferring selfies instead.

== Commercialization ==
Some celebrities still enjoy signing autographs for free for fans. Many people who stand outside premieres asking for autographs are actually professional autograph traders, who make their living or supplement their income by selling them for full profit, rather than keeping them as a personal souvenir. This is one of the main reasons why some celebrities only give their signatures for a fee. Joe DiMaggio was able to earn more money through signing fees than he made in his playing career, though he also gave individual autographs. Bill Russell did not sign at all in public, and only sparingly at private sessions. Michael Jordan reportedly did not sign for most of his career because of safety concerns about frenzied attempts to get his signature, which is worth thousands of dollars. Jordan has frequently signed at more peaceful events, such as golf tournaments. Pete Rose was paid to sign 30 baseballs with the inscription "I'm sorry I bet on baseball." In the 1980s, actor/comedian Steve Martin carried business cards which he handed out to fans requesting an autograph; the cards read "This certifies that you have had a personal encounter with me and that you found me warm, polite, intelligent and funny."

Realizing the potential profit in the sale of pop culture autographs, many dealers also would wait for hours for a celebrity to emerge from a location, present several photos for the celebrity to sign and then sell most of them. Michael Jackson's experience was typical; he often signed just a handful of autographs as he rushed from his hotel to his vehicle. Some collectors take note of which celebrities are the most gracious or the least forthcoming. Some dealers would locate a celebrity's home address and write to them repeatedly asking for autographs. Some celebrities soon grew tired of the practice and limited their responses. Because of the many autographs a celebrity might sign over time, some check requests against a record of past requests. Boxer George Foreman, for instance, recorded the names and addresses of every person requesting an autograph to limit such abuses. Some famous people flatly refused to autograph anything for fans, such as the actors Paul Newman and Greta Garbo, and the aviator Charles A. Lindbergh.

=== Glossary ===
In autograph-auction catalogues the following abbreviations are used to help describe the type of letter or document that is being offered for sale.

- AD: Autograph Document (hand-written by the person to be collected, but not signed)
- ADS: Autograph Document Signed (written and signed by same individual)
- AL: Autograph Letter (hand-written by the person to be collected, but not signed)
- ALS: Autograph Letter Signed (hand-written and signed by same individual)
- AMs: Autograph Manuscript (hand-written; such as the draft of a play, research paper or music sheet)
- AMsS: Autograph Manuscript Signed (hand-written and signed by same individual)
- AMusQs: Autograph Musical Quotation Signed (hand-written and signed by same individual)
- AN: Autograph Note (no salutation or closing, usually shorter than a letter)
- ANS: Autograph Note Signed (hand-written and signed by same individual)
- APCS: Autograph Postcard Signed (hand-written and signed by same individual)
- AQS: Autograph Quote Signed (hand-written and signed by same individual; poem verse, sentence, or bar-of-music)
- DS: Document signed (printed, or while hand-written by another, is signed by individual sought to be collected)
- LS: Letter Signed (hand-written by someone else, but signed by the individual sought to be collected, frequently handwritten by secretaries before the advent of the typewriter)
- PS: Photograph Signed or Postcard Signed
- SP: Signed Photograph
- TLS: Typed Letter Signed
- TNS: Typed Note Signed
- folio: A printer's sheet of paper folded once to make two leaves, double quarto size or larger.
- octavo(8vo): A manuscript page about six-by-nine inches. (Originally determined by folding a printer's sheet of paper to form eight leaves.)
- quarto(4to): A manuscript page of about nine and one-half by twelve inches. (Originally determined by folding a printer's sheet of paper twice to form four leaves.)

== Duplication, forging and authentication ==
Autograph collectors enjoy assembling signed historical documents, letters, or objects as a way of capturing a piece of history. However, forgers seek to profit by selling forged items. Sometimes just the signature has been forged, in other instances the entire document has been fabricated. Differentiating forged from authentic autographs is almost impossible for the amateur collector, but a professional may be consulted.

One method commonly seen on eBay is called "preprinting" by many sellers. The item is only a photocopy of an actual autographed photo, usually printed on glossy home photo paper. Since this is almost always disclosed to the buyer, some may not consider these actual forgeries. eBay 30 day money back guarantee is not enough time to have a valid 3rd party such as Beckett authenticate the signature and send it back due to shipping durations. In October 2012, Chad Richard Baldwin of Gresham, Oregon, was sentenced to two years in prison for the sale of forged Babe Ruth and Beatles autographs. Baldwin is a highly skilled forger of sports memorabilia.

Forgers may go to great lengths to make their forgeries appear authentic. Some use blank end papers from old books upon which to write their fake signatures in an attempt to match the paper of the era in which the personality lived. They have researched ink formulations of the era that they want to replicate. A 1988 book that explores the production of impressive fake manuscripts pertaining to Mormons is A Gathering of Saints by Robert Lindsey.

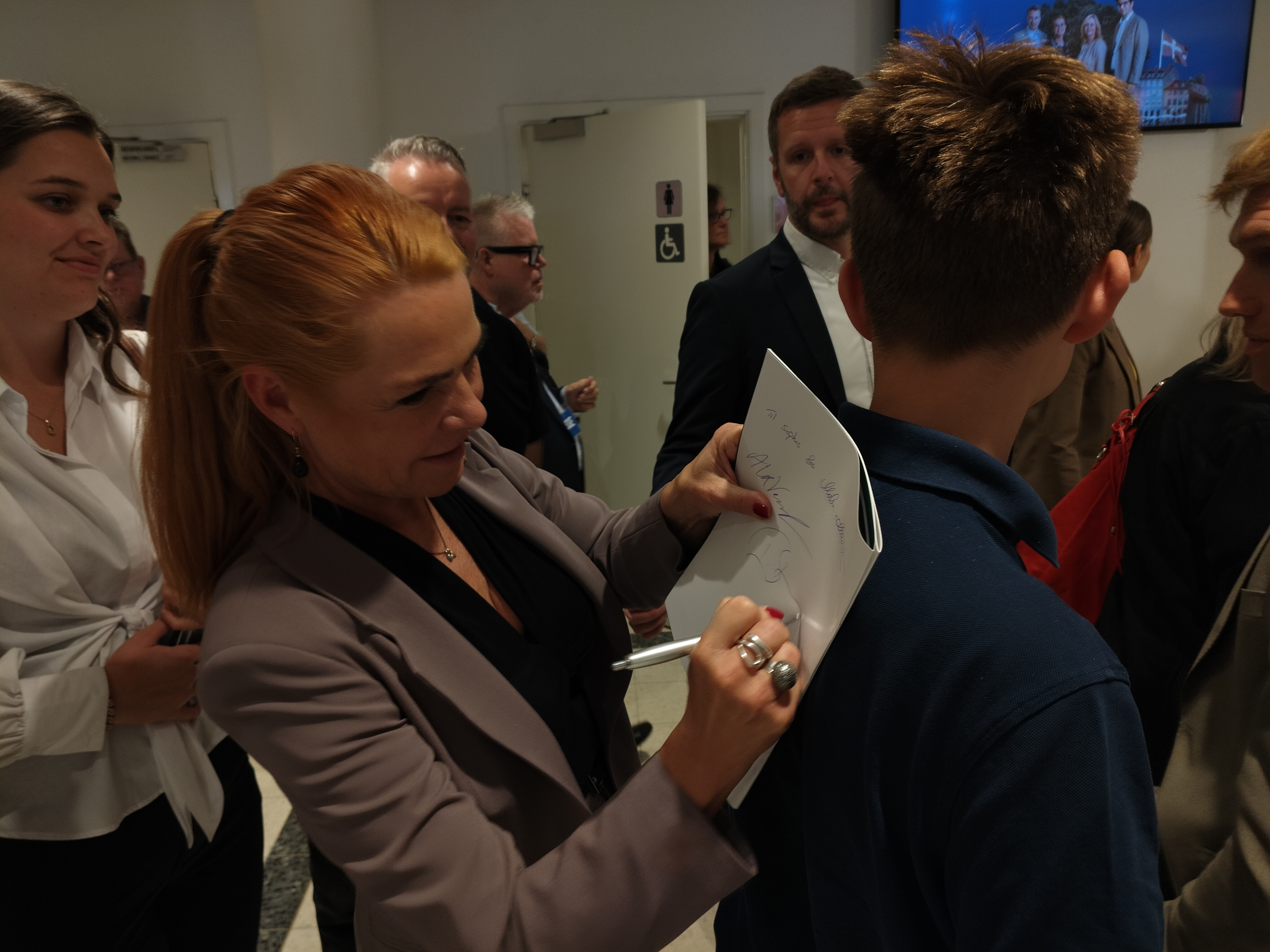
Danish politician Inger Støjberg signing an autograph against the back of the collector, 2025

Collectors should know the era in which American presidents signed their documents. American presidents signed land grants until President Andrew Jackson (c. 1836) became bored with the time-consuming task. Since then, secretaries of the president have mimicked their employer's signatures on these documents (known as "proxy" signatures). Many movie stars have their secretaries sign their letters and photographs for them. When Ronald Reagan was an actor during the 1940s, he had his mother sign his name to much of his fan mail.

During the American Civil War, Jefferson Davis's wife frequently signed his name to his dictated letters due to his extensive correspondence. As she duplicated his signature so well, she usually placed a period after the signature so that he could discern her signatures from his own.

All of the Union and Confederate generals from the American Civil War have had their signatures forged. Many were faked during the 1880s, a period that included the fad of aging soldiers in collecting Civil War autographs. Most deceptions were of mere signatures on a small piece of paper, but extensively written letters were forged as well. Collectors should be cautious of clipped signatures. The bogus autograph is glued onto an authentic steel-engraved portrait of the subject. Some steel engravings may have reprinted the autograph of the portrayed subject; this is known as a facsimile autograph, and it may appear to be real.

=== Secretarial signatures ===
Celebrities sometimes authorized secretaries to sign their correspondence. In the early months of World War II, U.S. Army Chief of Staff George C. Marshall felt obligated to sign every condolence letter sent to the families of slain soldiers. But as the death rate increased, he was forced to assign an assistant to forge his signature to the letters. The surrogate signatures were hard to distinguish from the originals. General Douglas MacArthur rarely signed a WWII condolence letter personally and all of his letters to families were signed by one of two assistants who tried hard to duplicate his signature but the forged signatures were distinguished by an unusually high letter "l" and a skinny "D". During the early stage of the Korean War, MacArthur personally signed condolence letters. As the fatalities increased, the General began to use letters with pre-printed signatures.

In the 1952 U.S. presidential election, General Dwight D. Eisenhower often had secretaries forge his name to campaign letters and "personally inscribed" autographed photographs.

Player signatures on baseballs and footballs that are actually signed by coaches and ballboys are called clubhouse signatures.

=== Autopen autographing ===
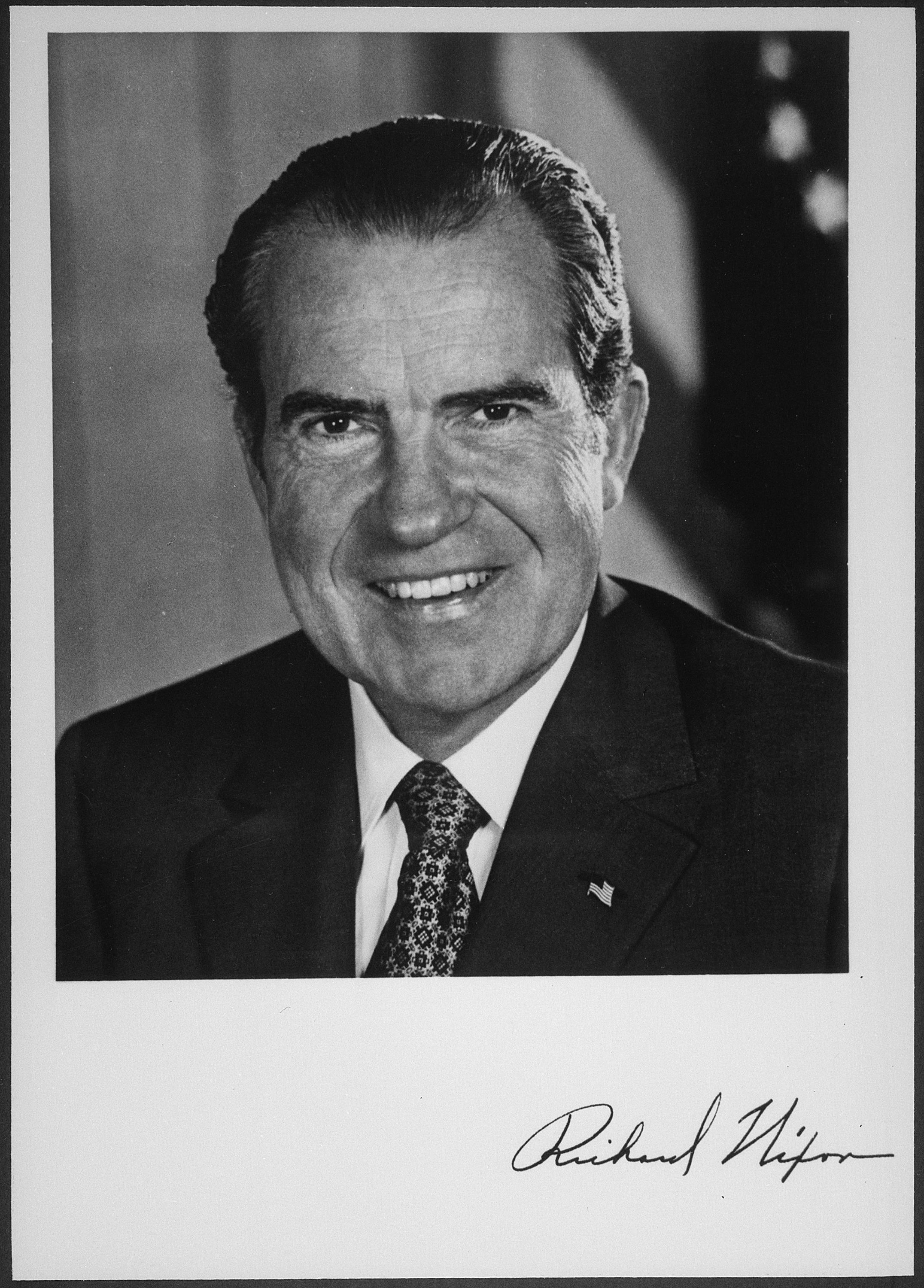
Portrait of U.S. President Richard Nixon with autopen signature

Since the early 1950s almost all American presidents have had an autopen or robot machine for the automatic signing of a signature as an autograph machine for their letters, photographs, books, official documents, and even memorabilia items such as baseballs and golf balls. Some former presidents even have continued to utilize the autopen after they have left office. The Signa-Signer can even write out in ink an authentically looking handwritten message that has been typed into the machine. One book detailing the use of this machine by President John F. Kennedy (1961–1963) is The Robot That Helped to Make a President by Charles Hamilton.

Since the 1960s, the practice of using an autopen has spread to U.S. Cabinet members, U.S. Senators, some state governors, and many other personalities who have a high volume of correspondence with the public.

Astronaut Alan Shepard acknowledged that NASA used the autopen machine to sign the astronauts' voluminous correspondence. Many large corporations also use these machines for signing business letters. Although autopen signatures should constantly match one another, they will eventually change as the signature drum becomes worn, and thereby alters the signature. Due to these professional imitations, buyers are often wary of buying presidential or astronaut signatures from unknown sellers.

=== Deceptive devices ===
Some personalities have used a rubber or steel hand-stamp to "sign" their documents. American President Andrew Johnson (c. 1866) did so during his tenure as a senator prior to assuming the presidency, since his right hand was injured in a train accident. This is why his autograph as president differs from previous autographs. President Warren Harding frequently used a rubber stamp while he was a senator. Presidents Theodore Roosevelt and Franklin Delano Roosevelt used them, along with President Woodrow Wilson (c. 1916). England's King Henry VIII and Pennsylvania colony founder William Penn used a deceiving hand stamp.

Joseph Stalin had several rubber signature stamps which were used on awards and Communist Party cards. Nikita Khrushchev and Lavrenti Beria, the KGB chief, used similar stamps.

Quality forgeries have been made for many of Europe's past rulers. The French nobles had their secrétaires sign their documents. Many forgeries of Napoleon's (c. 1800) war orders exist; he was so busy with battle concerns that he barely had enough time to sign promotion orders for generals, so his scribes applied his name to lesser documents.

Many famous astronauts, Arctic explorers, musicians, poets, and literary authors have had forgeries of their epistles and signatures produced. False signatures of Charles Lindbergh were clandestinely signed onto real 1930-era airmail envelopes bought at stamp shops and then re-sold to unwary buyers; the same has occurred with Amelia Earhart and the Wright brothers. Mickey Mouse creator Walt Disney had several of his cartoonists duplicate his artistic signature on replies to children seeking his autograph. Disney's actual autograph was distinctly different from the way it appears in his cartoons.

Texan paper currency was signed in ink by Sam Houston, though not handwritten by Houston himself.

The October 1986 Smithsonian magazine explored The Persistence of Memory, a 1931 painting by the Spanish artist Salvador Dalí. It quoted one of his secretaries as claiming that she signed the artist's signature to postcard depictions of his paintings. Another article in the April 2005 Smithsonian noted: "In 1965 he began selling signed sheets of otherwise blank lithograph paper for $10 a sheet. He may have signed well over 50,000 in the remaining quarter century of his life, an action that resulted in a flood of Dalí lithograph forgeries."

Some deceivers cut pages from books that American President Richard Nixon signed on the blank flyleaf, typed his letter of resignation from the presidency on that signed page, and then sold the doctored item as if Nixon had personally signed a scarce copy of the historical document. This practice has expanded to include quotations from George W. Bush, Hillary Clinton, John F. Kennedy, and Franklin D. Roosevelt.

=== Authentication ===
With the recent enormous growth of autograph sellers on eBay, and the appearance of a multitude of new galleries and retailers offering expensive autographs, casual autograph collectors and one-time buyers have in many instances sought certificates of authenticity issued by the seller at the time of sale. As with any guarantee, these certificates are only as dependable as the seller issuing them, and if the seller is a fraud, then the certificate, and the possibility that the signed item could be considered worthless. Any certificate or similar issued by a seller should always include the seller's full contact details and any details of Association memberships, and these should always be double checked on the Associations website.

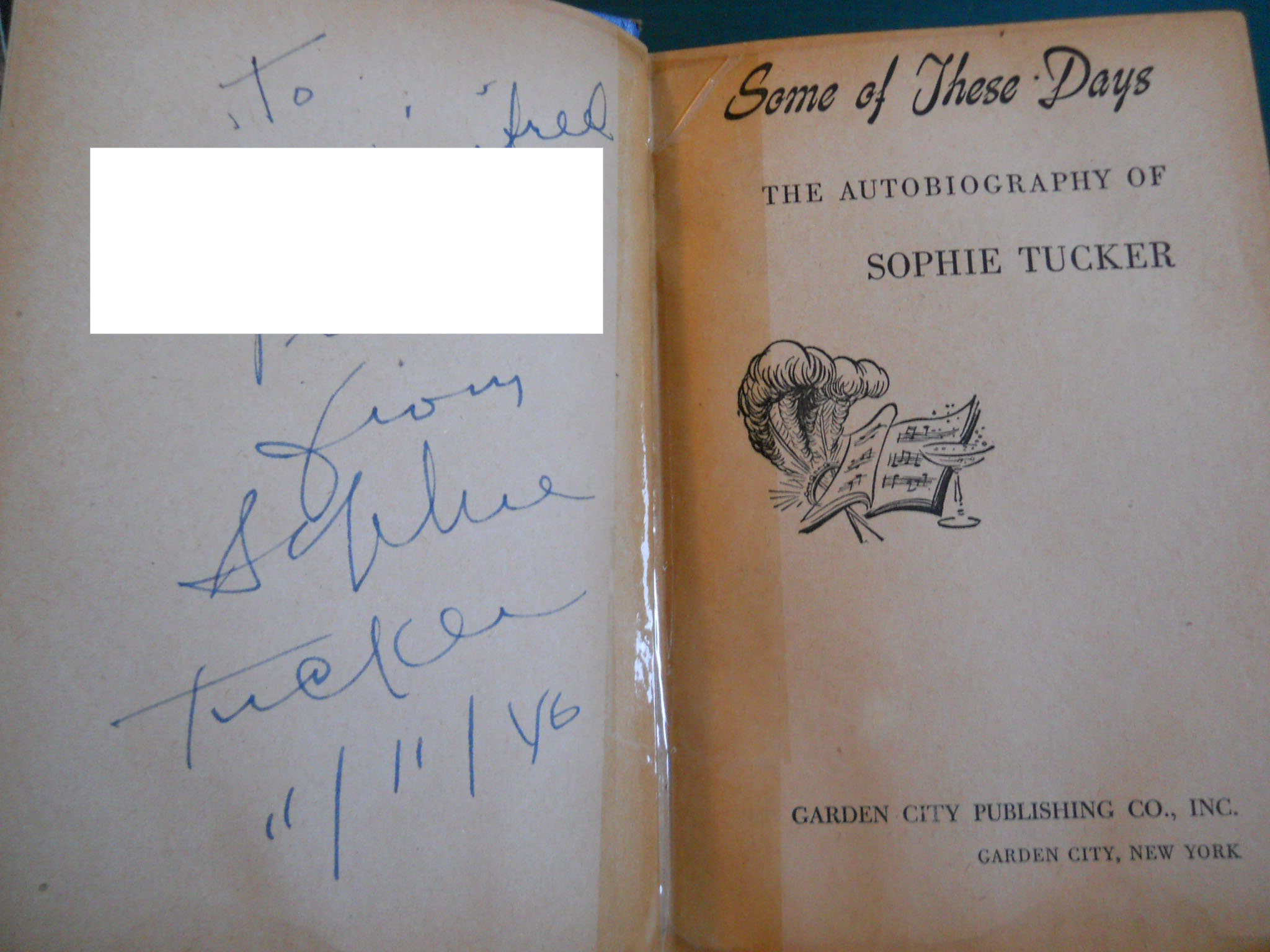
Vaudeville entertainer Sophie Tucker's autograph in a copy of her 1945 autobiography

In many instances, sellers will use a professional authenticator to determine the authenticity of the material they wish to bring to market. The autograph industry is currently contentiously split between two types of authenticators: those who rely upon their professional expertise and experience personally having collected or sold large inventories of autographs over a period of many years, such as the consultants at AutographCOA.com (ACOA), and "forensic examiners" who rely on academic credentials. Disputes have led to court actions, most notably gallery owner American Royal Arts vs. Beatles autograph dealer Frank Caiazzo, often used by autograph sources such as RR Auction.

Potential autograph buyers uncertain of the legitimacy of the seller or authenticator may research both parties, and may check any dealer who claims membership of any association. PADA, the UACC, RACC, and AFTAL include a list of dealers on their websites. This research should not be limited to a seller's or an authenticator's website which could be prejudiced. Some dealers have been known to invent their own association, e.g. "The Universal Manuscript Society", to enhance their reputations.

Mastro Auctions, a major sports autograph auction house which used a professional authenticator, was sued by a dealer in 2006 (Bill Daniels v. Mastro Auctions, Boone County, Indiana, case #06D01-0502 -PL- 0060). Daniels said that he had bought more than 2,000 signed photographs of athletes from Mastro and claimed that the catalog incorrectly described them as all being in color and 8" x 10" in size. Daniels also claimed that some of the autographs on the photographs may have been fakes. He produced two dealers who he said were autograph experts, but Superior Court Judge Matthew C. Kincaid excluded their testimony saying that neither Steve Koschal nor Richard Simon "possess sufficient skill, knowledge or experience in the fields in which they were asked to render opinions." The law for each state is different regarding qualifications to testify. Simon and Koschal have both testified in states where their testimony is accepted in court.

=== Other authenticity issues ===
Forgers buy real American Revolutionary War-era documents and surreptitiously pen a famous patriot's name between other real signatures in a manuscript in hope of deceiving an unsuspecting buyer. Others will use tea or tobacco stains to brown or age their modern missives.

Many autographed items of famous American sports players being sold over the Internet are fakes. Baseball legend Babe Ruth, for instance, has had his signature forged on old baseballs, then rubbed in dirt to make them appear to be from the 1930s.

=== British royal family ===
The British royal family is strictly forbidden from signing autographs because of the risk of the autographs being forged by others for use for their commercial gain. British royal family autographs, however, do exist, both from past royals and current ones, such as two 2010 examples when both (the then Prince) Charles and Prince Harry signed autographs to one person each.

== Copyright status of signatures ==
Under British law, the appearance of signatures (not the names themselves) may be protected under copyright law.

Under United States Copyright Law, "titles, names [I c...]; mere variations of typographic ornamentation, lettering, or coloring" are not eligible for copyright; however, the appearance of signatures (not the names themselves) may be protected under copyright law.

== Autograph collecting during the COVID-19 pandemic ==
The COVID-19 pandemic saw normal interactions between people change in many human interacting areas, including autograph collecting. Several Major League Baseball teams, for example, employed a new strategy in which their players would sign team assigned items before their games and then have a team employee handle them to fans present near the stadium, to prevent the virus from spreading further on the communities they play at.

American football's National Football League, on the other hand, banned all autograph signings during their games, as part of their new fans and players' safety protocol rules.

== See also ==
- Autograph Collector Magazine
- Huaya
- Khelrtva
- Tughra
- Autograph show
