= Anja Orthodox =

Polish musician, singer, songwriter and composer

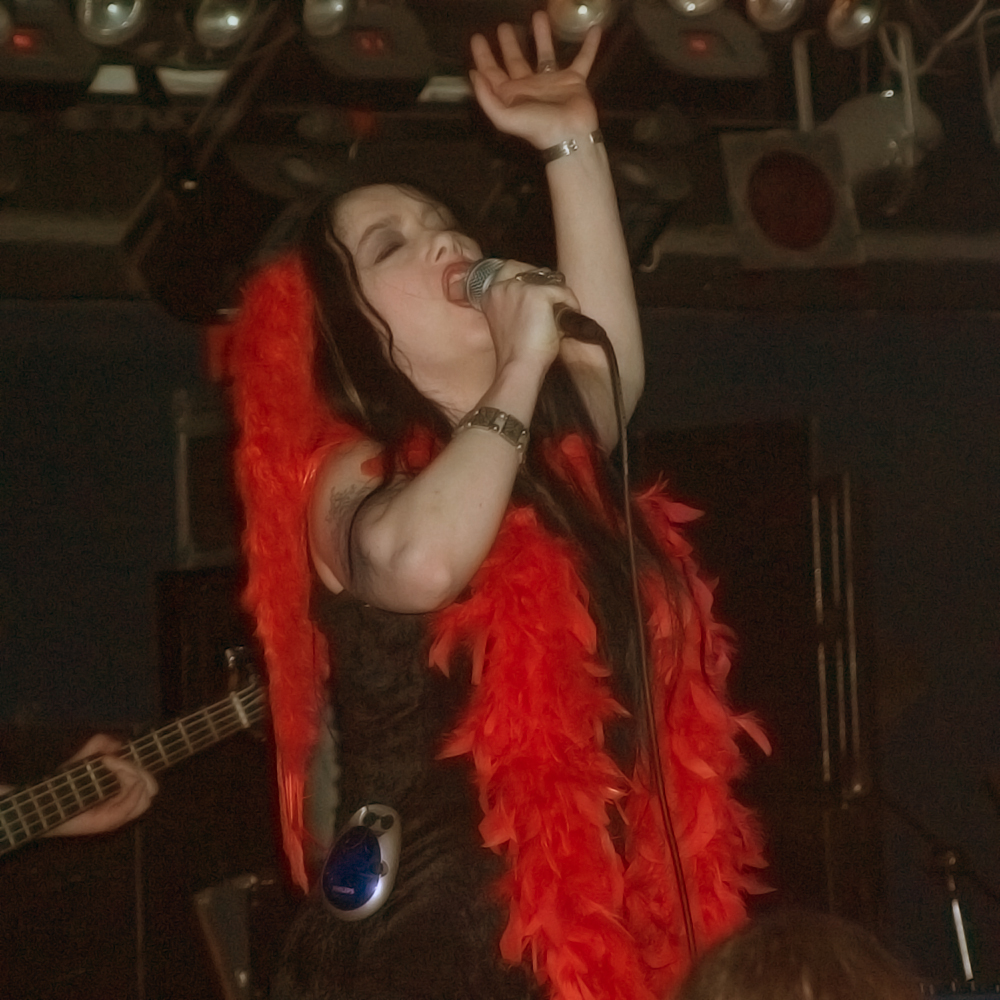
Anja Orthodox in 2003 singing

Anja Orthodox (born December 24, 1964, in Warsaw) is a Polish musician, singer, songwriter and composer. She is known primarily for her many years of performances in the band Closterkeller, performing music from the borderline of rock and gothic metal. She has also collaborated with bands such as Wilki, Sweet Noise, Voo Voo, Abraxas and Ira. She is often referred to by the media as "the first lady of Polish metal and gothic".

== Career ==
She started singing professionally in 1987. For eight years she was an extra at the Grand Theatre in Warsaw. In 1987, she made her debut as an actress in the role of Frania in the comedy O rany, nic się się!!! alongside Wojciech Malajkat.

On January 1, 1988, she became the lead singer of the band Closterkeller, which ensured her greatest popularity. She also collaborated as a guest vocalist in multiple bands: Wilki, Sweet Noise, Voo Voo, IRA, Sexbomba, Piersi, Kobranocka, Abraxas, Pornografia, Mordor and Delator.

In 1994 she played the role of the leader of Hell's Angels in the play Goldberg Variations staged at the Powszechny Theatre in Warsaw. Also in 1994 she took part in the recording of the single of the band Golden Life entitled "24.11.1994", in which she sang, m.in together with Grzegorz Markowski, Fiolka, Artur Gadowski. As part of the charity campaign Postcard to Santa Claus, in December 2000 she recorded a song entitled "Są marzenia" alongside Urszula, Krzysztof Cugowski, Grzegorz Markowski and Beata Kozidrak. Three years later, together with the musicians of the band Abraxas, she recorded the album "Granica czerni i biała" (as the main vocalist and songwriter) under the name Svann.

In 2004, she was a member of the jury of the TOPtrendy festival organized by Polsat TV. In 2006 she supported the action "Help children live with dignity", recording a song entitled "Hope".

She is the author of some of the lyrics of bands such as Virgin, Volver or Hopsa. In addition, she wrote columns for magazines and Internet portals, m.in Teraz Rock, Onet.pl or Machina. She supports aspiring artists, she is often invited as a juror to reviews of young bands.

In 2011 she took part in the recording of the album OME – Tomek Beksiński, recording the song "Po deszczu". In January 2011 she started hosting a weekly show entitled "Abracadabra" on RadioWWW, on January 9, 2013, the last broadcast was recorded, after which the radio suspended its activities. In autumn 2018 she was one of the jurors of the talent-show of Polsat TV Śpiewajmy razem. All Together Now.
