= Autograph Collector Magazine =

U.S. magazine for autograph collectors

Autograph Collector Magazine was a U.S. magazine for autograph collectors. The magazine was started in 1986. They offered news, celebrity interviews and addresses, in-person signing event listings, counterfeit-detection articles, and in-depth articles on collecting autographs from people in various professions, from sports to Hollywood to business and more. The magazine was, in its later incarnation, a web-only publication. The print version was previously published on a monthly basis.

The magazine was headquartered in Corona, California.
