= Cross County, Arkansas =

County in Arkansas, United States

- County
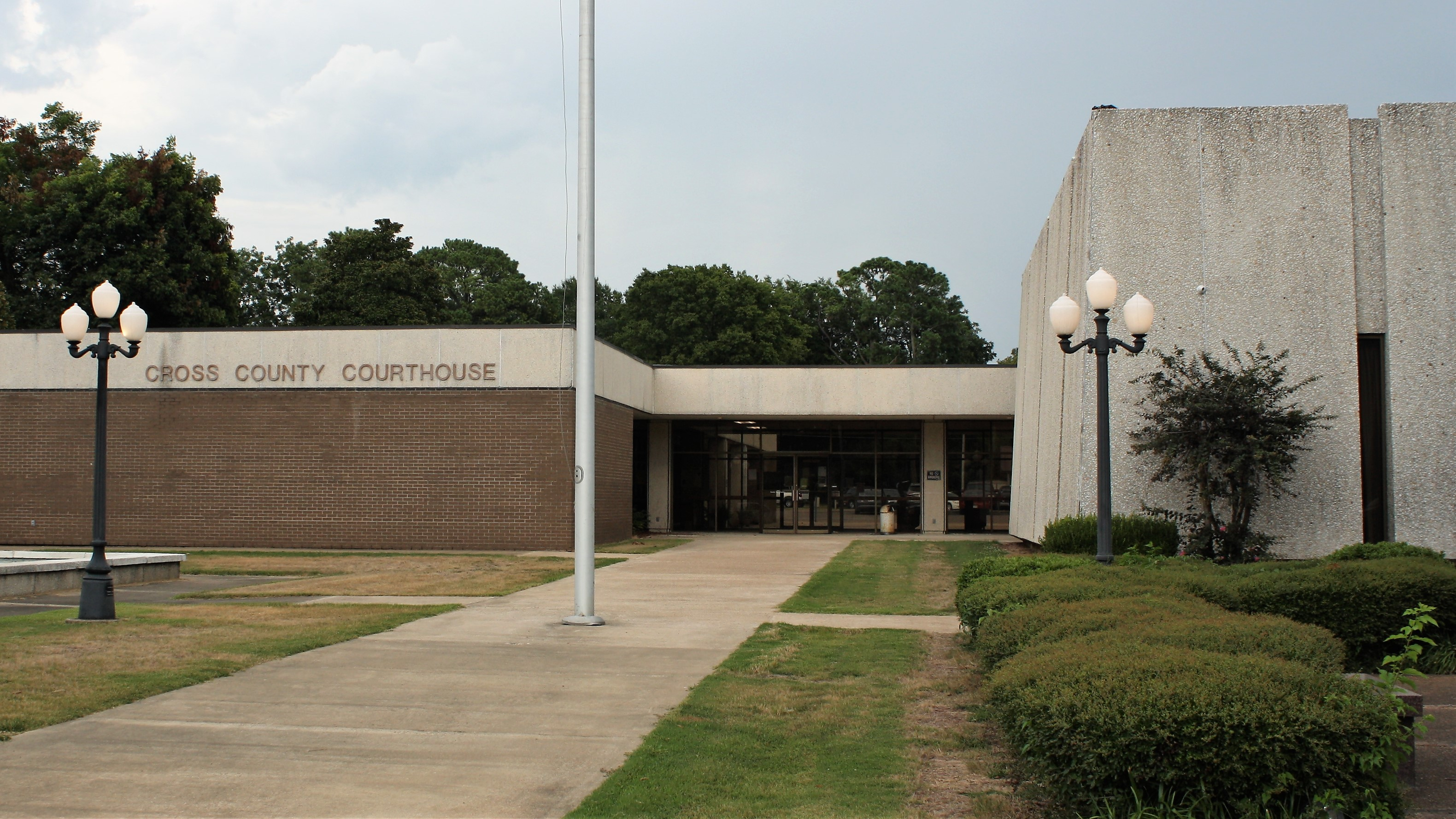
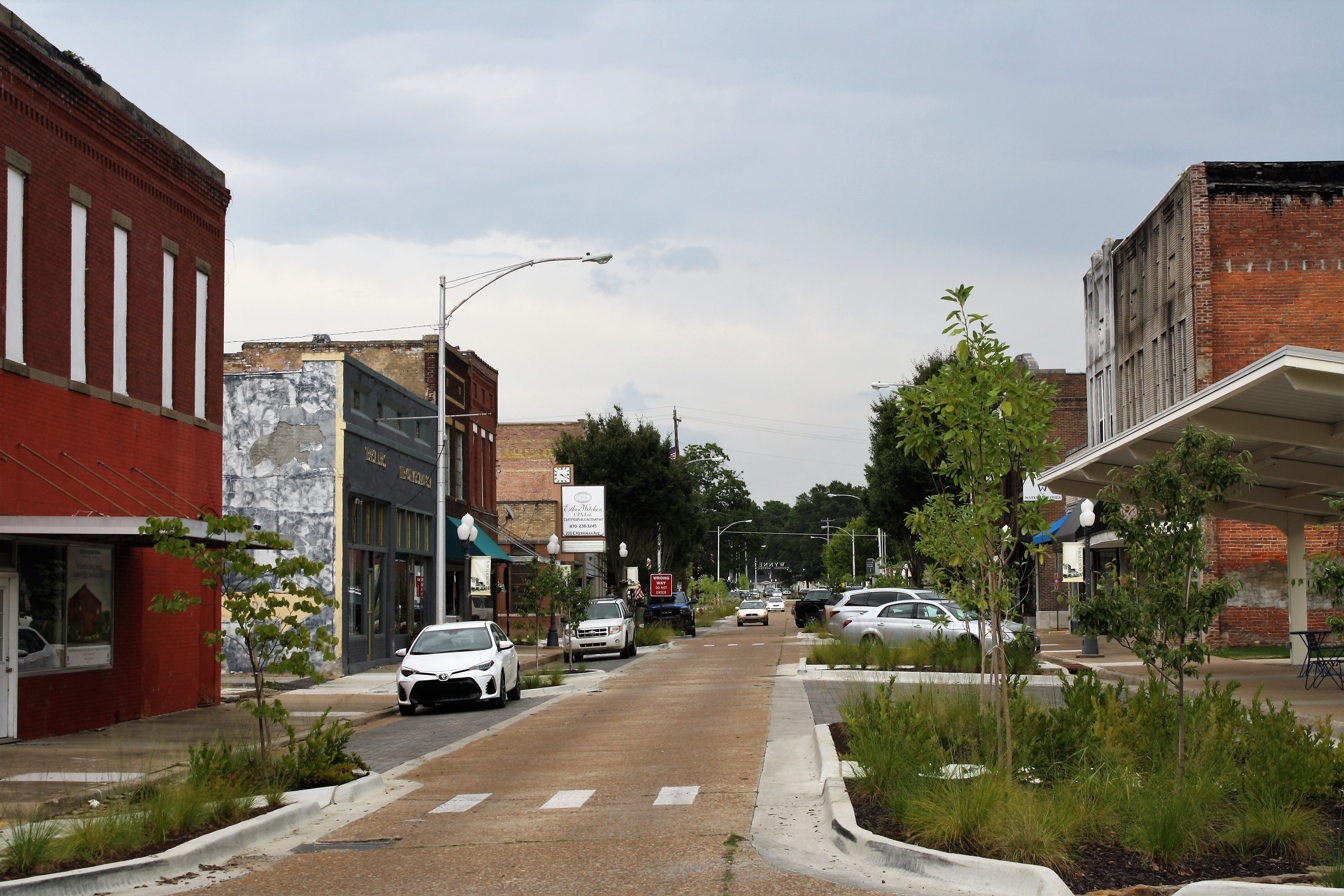
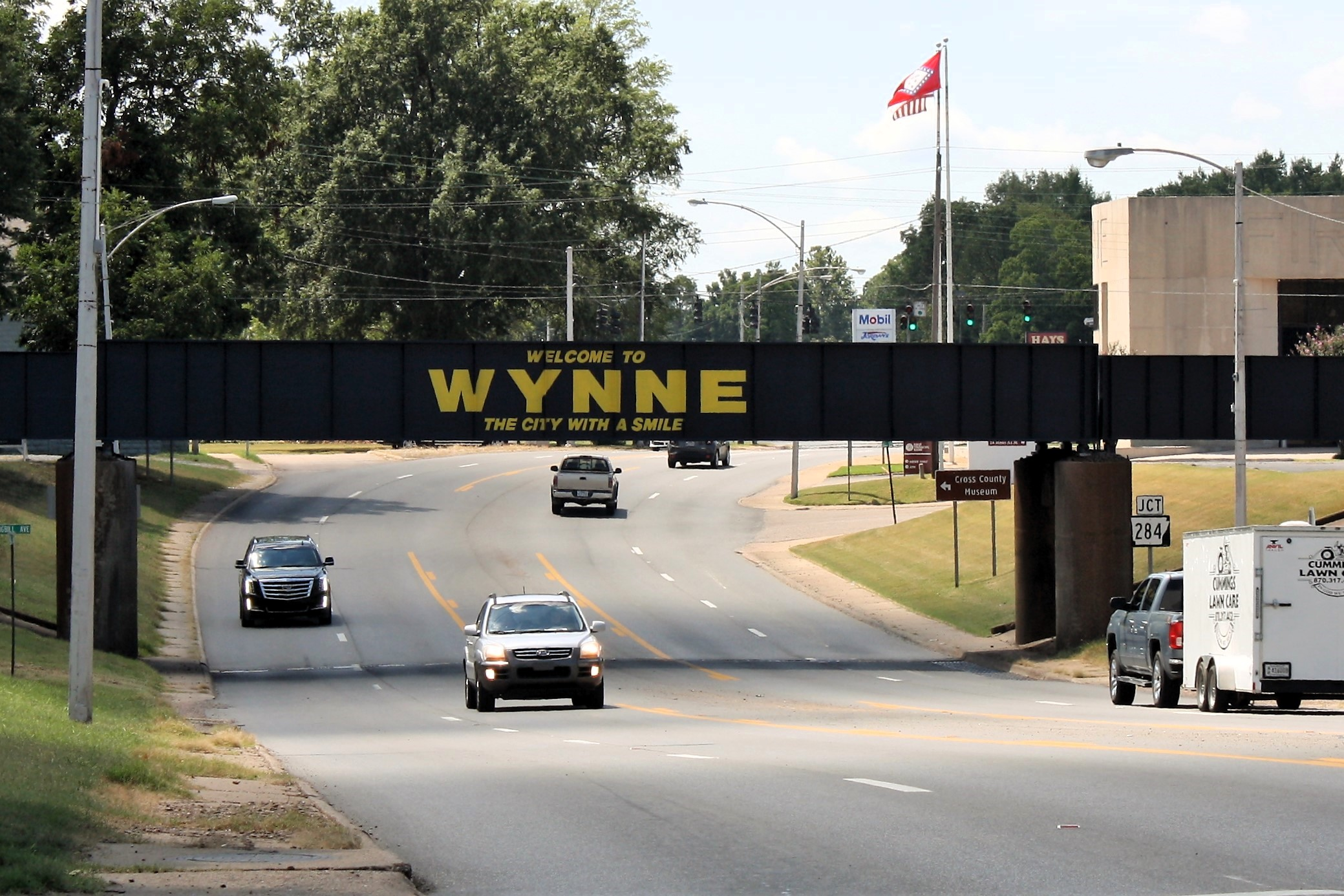
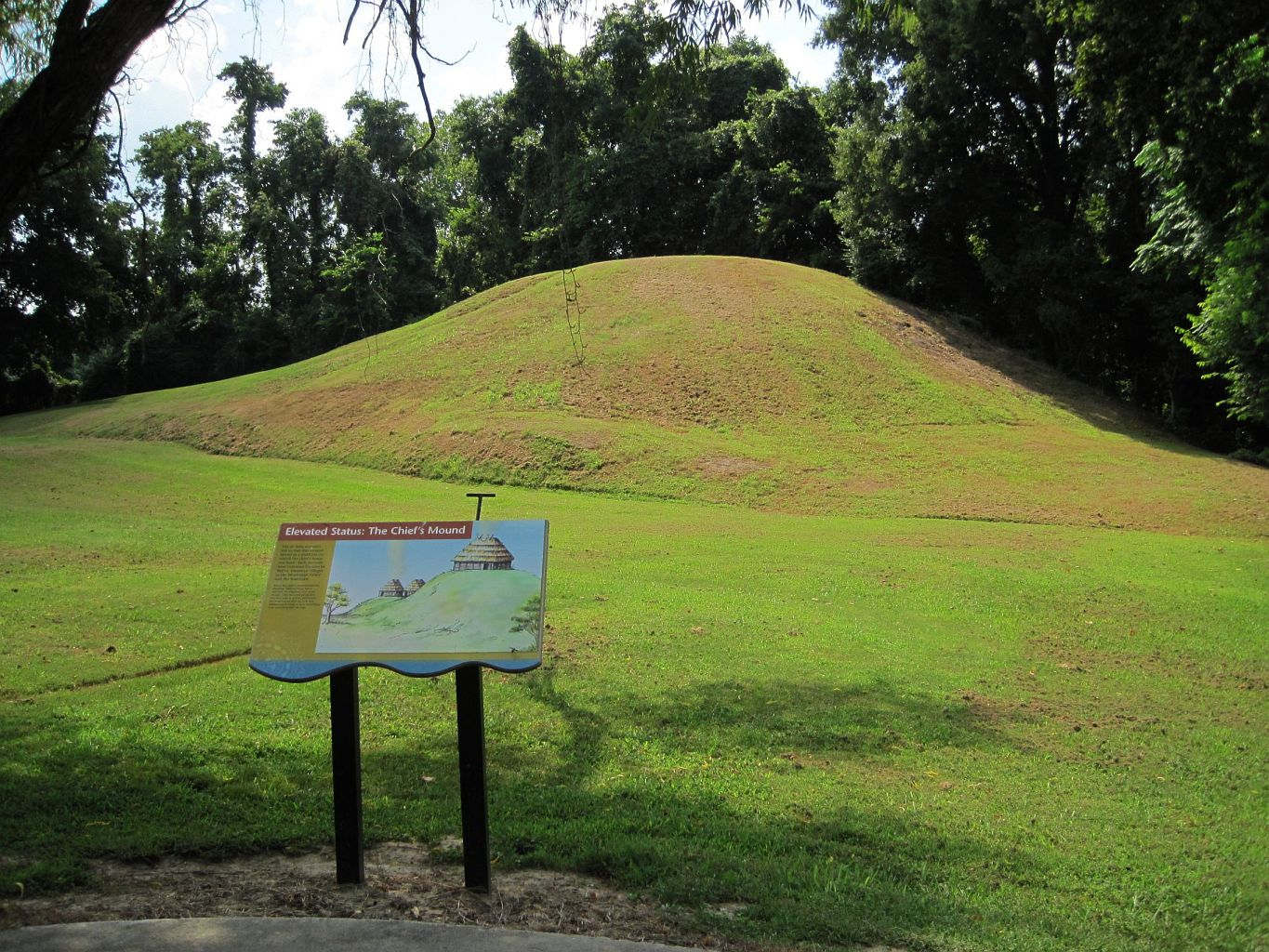
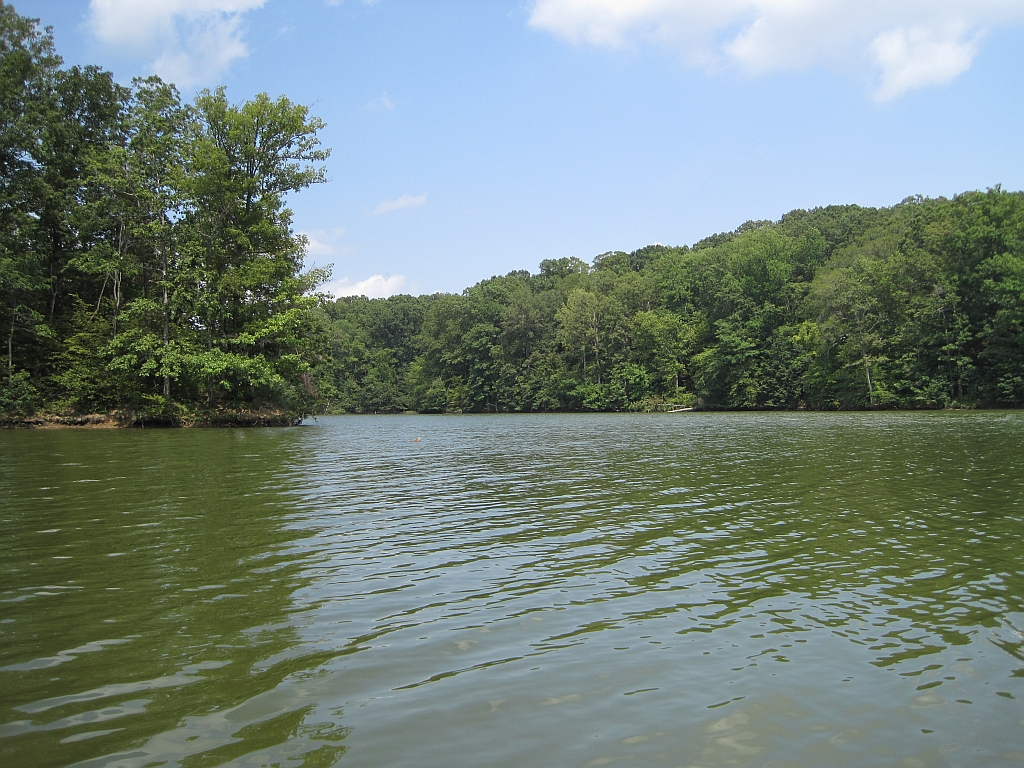
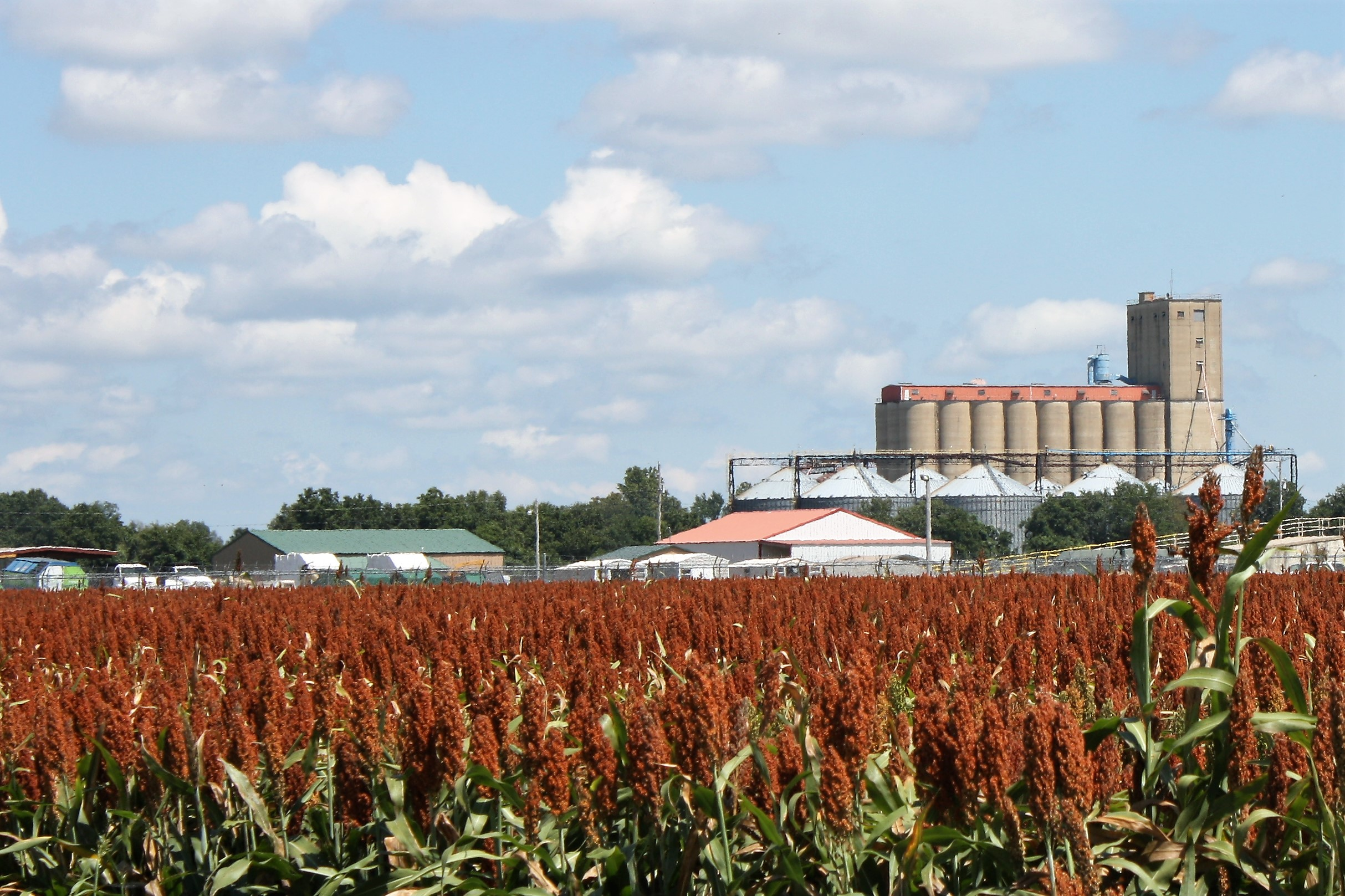
- Clockwise from top: Cross County Courthouse, the railroad overpass in Wynne, Lake Austell at Village Creek State Park, a sorghum field with Wynne grain elevator in the background, a preserved Native American mound at Parkin Archaeological State Park, and streetside in the Wynne Commercial Historic District

- Flag Seal

- Location within the U.S. state of Arkansas
- Coordinates: 35°17′30″N 90°46′24″W
- Country: United States
- State: Arkansas
- Founded: November 15, 1862
- Named for: David C. Cross
- Seat: Wynne
- Largest city: Wynne

Area
  - Total: 622.33 sq mi (1,611.8 km^{2})
  - Land: 615.85 sq mi (1,595.0 km^{2})
  - Water: 6.48 sq mi (16.8 km^{2}) 1.0%

Population (2020)
  - Total: 16,833
  - Estimate (2025): 16,186 ▼
  - Density: 27.333/sq mi (10.553/km^{2})
- Time zone: UTC−6 (Central)
  - Summer (DST): UTC−5 (CDT)
- Congressional district: 1st
- Website: crosscountyar.org

Cross County is a rural Northeast Arkansas county in the Arkansas Delta. Created as Arkansas's 53rd county on November 15, 1862, Cross County contains four incorporated municipalities, including Wynne, the county seat and most populous city. It is named for Confederate Colonel David C. Cross, a political leader in the area.

The county is largely flat and fertile, mostly used for row agriculture typical of the rich alluvial soils of the Arkansas Delta. Crowley's Ridge, a forested deposit of loess hills rising from the flat Delta bisects the county from north to south, including part of Wynne and most of Village Creek State Park, the county's primary protected area of ecological value. Historical and cultural features range from Parkin Archeological State Park, which preserves a prehistoric Native American mound building settlement, to the Johnston Cotton Gin marking mechanization of the cotton farm, and the Northern Ohio School, a segregated school built by a lumber company for African-American children of employees.

Cross County occupies 622.33 square miles (1,612 ha) and contained a population of 16,833 as of the 2020 census. The economy is largely based on agriculture. Poverty and unemployment rates are above national averages, household incomes are below state and national averages.

Cross County is mostly served by two school districts: Cross County School District and Wynne Public Schools. Higher education is provided at the Wynne campus of East Arkansas Community College, a public community college. Crossridge Community Hospital in Wynne is a community hospital providing primary care in the county. Although no Interstate highways serve Cross County, the county has access to two United States highways (US Highway 49 [US 49] and US 64) and thirteen Arkansas state highways. Cross County is also served by one public owned/public use general aviation airport, Wynne Municipal Airport, and seven community water systems provide potable water to customers in the county.

== History ==
Cross County was formed in November 1862 by the Arkansas State Legislature from portions of St. Francis, Crittenden, and Poinsett Counties. The first county seat was Whittsburg, located due east of modern Wynne.

In 1882, the first railroad, the Helena & Iron Mountain Railroad, was constructed in Cross County. The line was later bought out by the St. Louis, Iron Mountain, & Southern Railroad. In 1903, the county seat was moved to Wynne.

== Geography ==
Cross County is established on the rich, fertile, alluvial soils of the Mississippi Alluvial Plain. In Arkansas, this region is called the Arkansas Delta (in Arkansas, usually referred to as "the Delta"), having a distinct history and culture from adjacent regions. Bisecting the county from north to south is Crowley's Ridge, a geologic anomaly rising from the Delta composed of loess soil and generally remains covered in oak-hickory forest. Today, the majority (68 percent) of the county is used for row agriculture. (Note: In 2018, 151.5 thousand acres of soybeans, 88.1 thousand acres of rice, and 19.8 thousand acres of corn were planted in Cross County. Total acreage for those crops is 259,400. Cross County is 622 square miles, which is 380,160 acres based on 640 acres per square mile. Acreage for the total crops (259,400) divided by acreage for the county (398,080) is 68.2 percent. Cotton, sorghum, and wheat were also grown, but were not reported in sufficient quantities to warrant county-specific tabulation, so were not included in the planted acreage.)

Roughly the western third of the county is within the Western Lowlands Pleistocene Valley Train subregion of the Delta. This region is characterized as flat windblown deposits of silty, sandy soils, and loess with a high groundwater table. Post oak and loblolly pine are native in the higher elevations, with overcup oak, water hickory, willow oak, and pin oak and pondberry native in wetlands. Today, row agriculture is extensive (mostly soybeans and cotton), with commercial aquaculture (crawfish, baitfish, and catfish farms) also common.

Crowley's Ridge is a series of loess hills more closely associated with the Appalachian Mountains of Tennessee and Kentucky than the Delta country surrounding it. Composed of sandy loess stacked on gravel deposits later eroded by streams into ravines, Crowley's Ridge rises from the flat Delta by up to 500 feet (150 m). Crowley's Ridge remains largely wooded with oak-hickory forest or beech–maple forest, with little land in cultivation. Forests are related to the Appalachian cove forests, with post oak, blackjack oak, southern red oak, white oak, beech and sugar maple forest standing in contrast to the southern floodplain forests in the rest of Cross County.

The eastern third of Cross County is split between the Northern Holocene Meander Belts and St. Francis Lowlands, both subregions historically influenced by the Mississippi River. Both regions are flat, poorly drained areas consisting of former river channels, drainageways, and floodplains drained in the late 19th century for settlement and row agriculture. Today consisting of farm fields, channelized drainage ditches, levees, the area is predominantly in soybean and cotton cultivation, with some corn, wheat, rice, and sorghum. Remaining natural areas consist of sugarberry, elm, ash tree, pecan, cottonwood, and sycamores. Sandy "Sunk lands" are attributed to the 1811–12 New Madrid earthquakes.

Given Cross County's position along the Mississippi Flyway, many natural areas and grain fields serve as wintering ground for water fowl. Duck hunting is popular in the Delta, including Cross County.

According to the U.S. Census Bureau, the county has a total area of 622.33 square miles (1,611.8 km^{2}), of which 615.85 square miles (1,595.0 km^{2}) is land and 6.48 square miles (16.8 km^{2}) (1.0%) is water. It ranks 49th of the 75 Arkansas counties in area.

The county is located approximately 46 miles (74 km) south of Jonesboro, 48 miles (77 km) west of Memphis, Tennessee, and 105 miles (169 km) east of Little Rock. (Note: Mileages from Cross County to Jonesboro, Memphis, and Little Rock are based on highway miles using county seat Wynne for Cross County.) Cross County is surrounded by five other Delta counties: Crittenden County to the east, St. Francis County to the south, Woodruff County to the west, Jackson County to the northwest, and Poinsett County to the north.

=== Hydrology ===
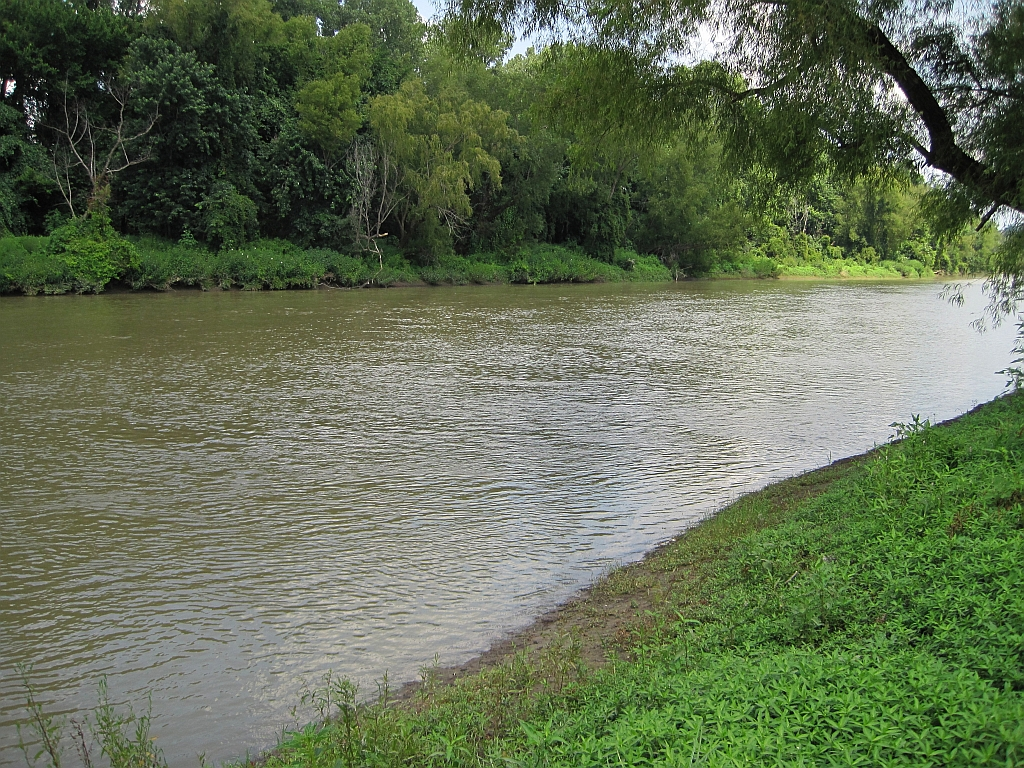
St. Francis River at Parkin

Water is an important part of Cross County's geography, history, and culture. Hydraulically, the county is split into two watersheds by Crowley's Ridge, with the eastern half draining to the St. Francis River or its tributaries, and the western half draining to the L'Anguille River.

The deep, wide, calm, and navigable St. Francis River has been important for every civilization in Cross County since prehistory. The Casqui tribe settled in the area where the Tyronza River empties into the St. Francis. Today, this settlement is preserved within Parkin Archaeological State Park. Centuries later, European settlers founded Wittsburg as a port city as the northernmost navigable point on the St. Francis a few miles downstream from Parkin, opening the region to regional trade. Within the county, Brushy Creek, Cross County Ditch, Copeland Slough, Prairie Creek, and Village Creek are important watercourses.

=== Protected areas ===
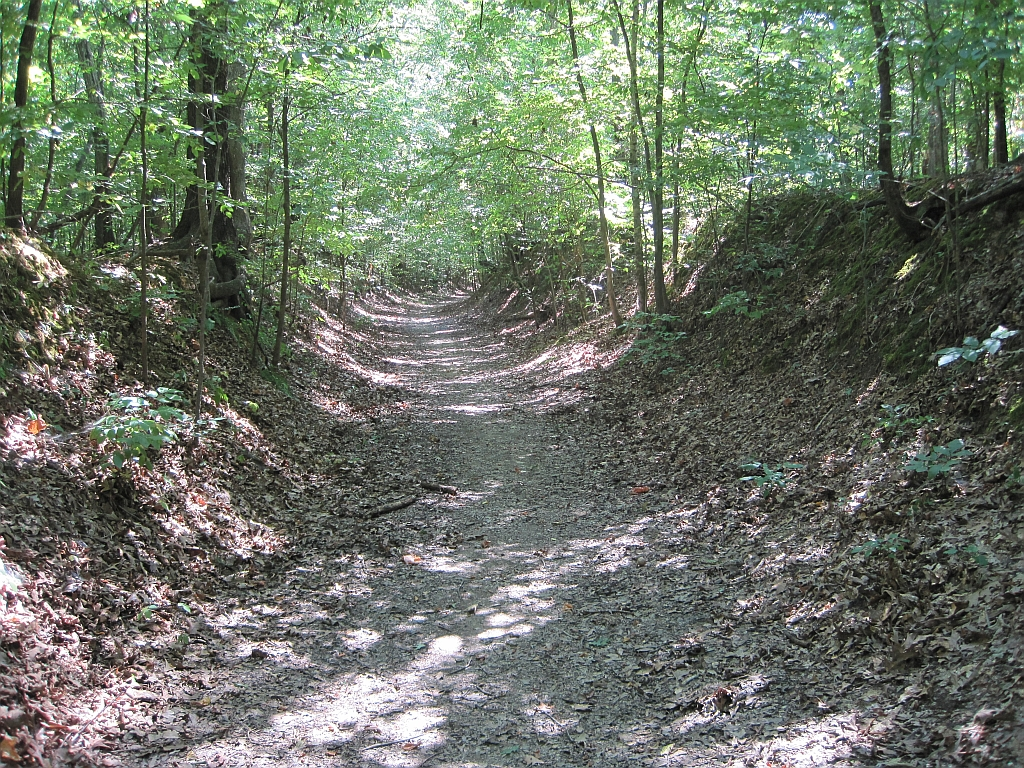
This segment of the Memphis to Little Rock Road in Village Creek State Park is listed on the National Register of Historic Places and is preserved as a trail

The largest protected area in Cross County is Village Creek State Park on Crowley's Ridge near Wynne. The park is known as a large section of preserved forest in its natural state within the Delta, a 27-hole golf course, catfish and bass fishing in the two lakes, horseback riding trails, and a hiking trail along the former Memphis to Little Rock Military Road. The Parkin Archeological State Park in Parkin preserves a prehistoric Native American mound building settlement.

The Brushy Creek Wildlife Management Area is a small property reforested in bottomland hardwood forest by the Arkansas Game and Fish Commission near Hickory Ridge. The Arkansas Natural Heritage Commission maintains the Wittsburg Natural Area as natural Crowley's Ridge habitat, but there is no legal public access to the area.

== Demographics ==
Historical population
Census	Pop.	Note	%±
1870	3,915		—
1880	5,050		29.0%
1890	7,693		52.3%
1900	11,051		43.7%
1910	14,042		27.1%
1920	18,579		32.3%
1930	25,723		38.5%
1940	26,046		1.3%
1950	24,757		−4.9%
1960	19,551		−21.0%
1970	19,783		1.2%
1980	20,434		3.3%
1990	19,225		−5.9%
2000	19,526		1.6%
2010	17,870		−8.5%
2020	16,833		−5.8%
2025 (est.)	16,186	▼	−3.8%
U.S. Decennial Census; 1790–1960 1900–1990; 1990–2000 2010

=== 2020 census ===
Cross County Racial Composition
Race	Num.	Perc.
White	12,067	71.69%
Black or African American	3,651	21.69%
Native American	38	0.23%
Asian	102	0.61%
Pacific Islander	5	0.03%
Other/Mixed	618	3.67%
Hispanic or Latino	352	2.09%

As of the 2020 census, the county had a population of 16,833. The median age was 41.0 years. 24.6% of residents were under the age of 18 and 18.8% of residents were 65 years of age or older. For every 100 females there were 93.0 males, and for every 100 females age 18 and over there were 89.0 males age 18 and over.

The racial makeup of the county was 72.6% White, 21.7% Black or African American, 0.3% American Indian and Alaska Native, 0.6% Asian, <0.1% Native Hawaiian and Pacific Islander, 0.9% from some other race, and 3.9% from two or more races. Hispanic or Latino residents of any race comprised 2.1% of the population.

44.9% of residents lived in urban areas, while 55.1% lived in rural areas.

There were 6,711 households in the county, of which 31.5% had children under the age of 18 living in them. Of all households, 46.8% were married-couple households, 18.2% were households with a male householder and no spouse or partner present, and 29.9% were households with a female householder and no spouse or partner present. About 27.9% of all households were made up of individuals and 12.7% had someone living alone who was 65 years of age or older.

There were 7,585 housing units, of which 11.5% were vacant. Among occupied housing units, 66.2% were owner-occupied and 33.8% were renter-occupied. The homeowner vacancy rate was 2.1% and the rental vacancy rate was 8.1%.

=== 2000 census ===
At the 2000 census, there were 19,526 people, 7,391 household, and 5,447 families residing in the county. The population density was 32 per square mile (12/km^{2}). There were 8,030 housing units at an average density of 13 per square mile (5.0/km^{2}). The racial makeup of the county was 74.80% White, 23.70% Black or African American, 0.23% Native American, 0.31% Asian, 0.01% Pacific Islander, 0.21% from other races, and 0.74% from two or more races. 0.93% of the population were Hispanic or Latino of any race.

There were 7,391 households, of which 34.70% had children under the age of 18 living with them, 55.20% were married couples living together, 14.10% had a female householder with no husband present, and 26.30% were non-families. 23.50% of all households were made up of individuals, and 11.10% had someone living alone who was 65 years of age or older. The average household size was 2.60 and the average family size was 3.07.

27.80% of the population were under the age of 18, 8.50% from 18 to 24, 27.40% from 25 to 44, 22.60% from 45 to 64, and 13.70% who were 65 years of age or older. The median age was 36 years. For every 100 females there were 94.00 males. For every 100 females age 18 and over, there were 89.40 males.

The median household income was $29,362 and the median family income was $34,044. Males had a median income of $27,880 and females $20,133. The per capita income for the county was $15,726. About 16.40% of families and 19.90% of the population were below the poverty line, including 27.90% of those under age 18 and 17.50% of those age 65 or over.

== Human resources ==
=== Education ===
Educational attainment in Cross County is typical for a rural Arkansas county: 83.6% of Cross County residents over age 25 held a high school degree or higher and 14.4% hold a bachelor's degree or higher, compared to Arkansas statewide averages of 86.6% and 23.0%. Cross County is significantly below national averages of 88.0% and 32.1%, respectively.

==== Primary and secondary education ====
Two public school districts are based in Cross County: Wynne School District and Cross County School District. Almost the entire county is served by one of these districts, except for a small area in the northeast corner served by Earle School District. The two Cross County districts also serve small areas in adjoining counties. Successful completion of the curriculum of these schools leads to graduation from Wynne Senior High School and Cross County High School respectively. Both high schools are accredited by the Arkansas Department of Education (ADE). Cross County HS is part of the New Tech Network.

==== Higher education ====
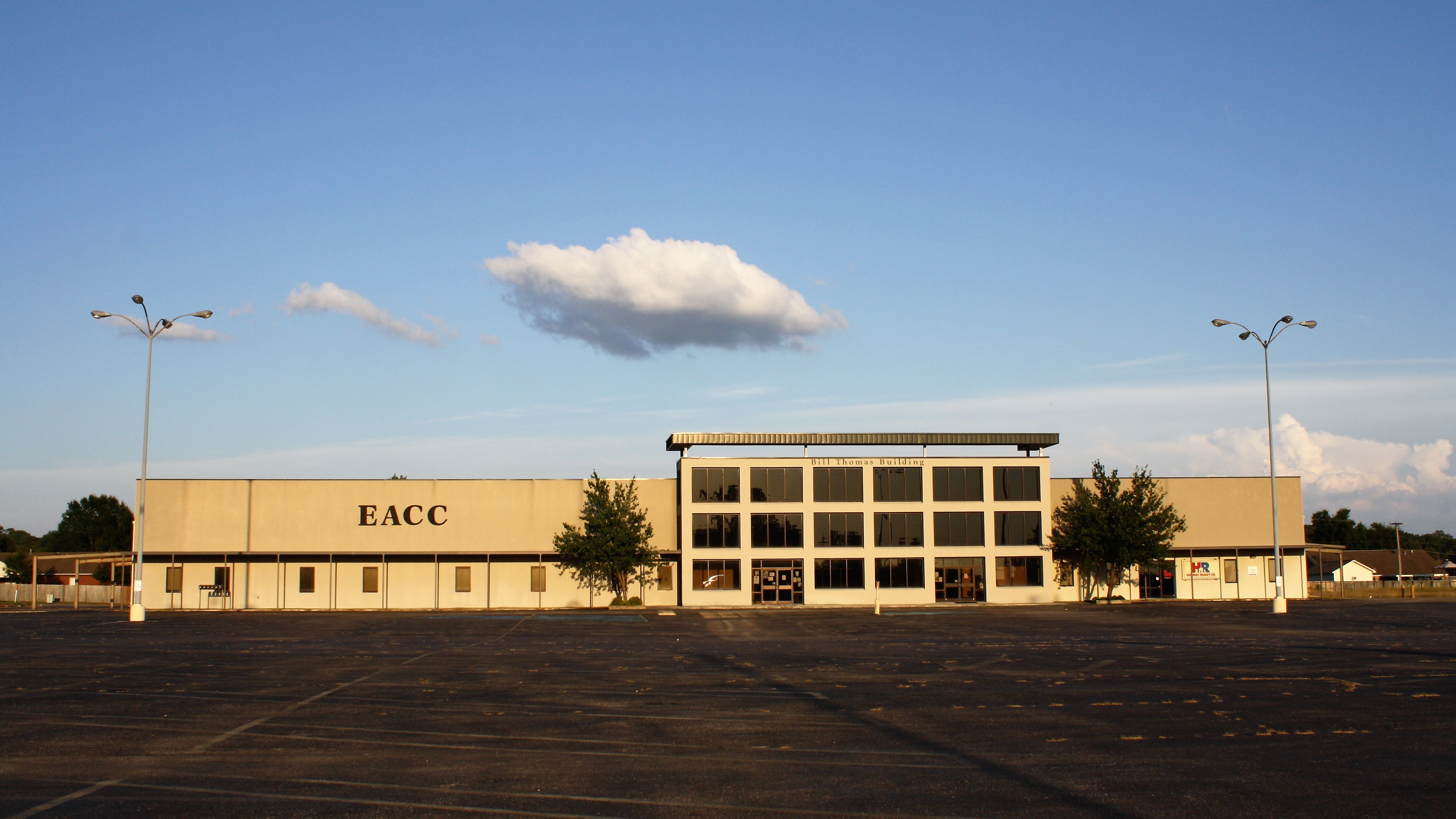
EACC-Wynne

Cross County contains one institution of higher education, the Wynne Campus of the East Arkansas Community College, a public community college based in Forrest City. The Arkansas State University System offers two institutions in the region: Arkansas State University, a public four-year university in Jonesboro, and Arkansas State University Mid-South, a public community college in West Memphis.

==== Libraries ====
The East Central Arkansas Regional Library is headquartered at the Cross County Library, 410 Merriman Avenue East in downtown Wynne. The Cross County Library has a branch library at 122 Wilson Street in Parkin.

=== Public health ===
The Cross County Hospital was established in 1952 in Wynne, and operated as a county hospital until a lease agreement with Jonesboro-based St. Bernards Healthcare started in 1999. Now known as CrossRidge Community Hospital, the hospital is supported by a 1% sales tax renewed by voters every four years. The nearest Level 1 Trauma Centers are RegionalOne Health Center and Le Bonheur Children's Hospital, both in Memphis.

The county's population is significantly above healthy weight, with 39.4% of adults ranking as obese, above the state average of 35.7%, itself significantly above national average of 29.6%.

=== Public safety ===
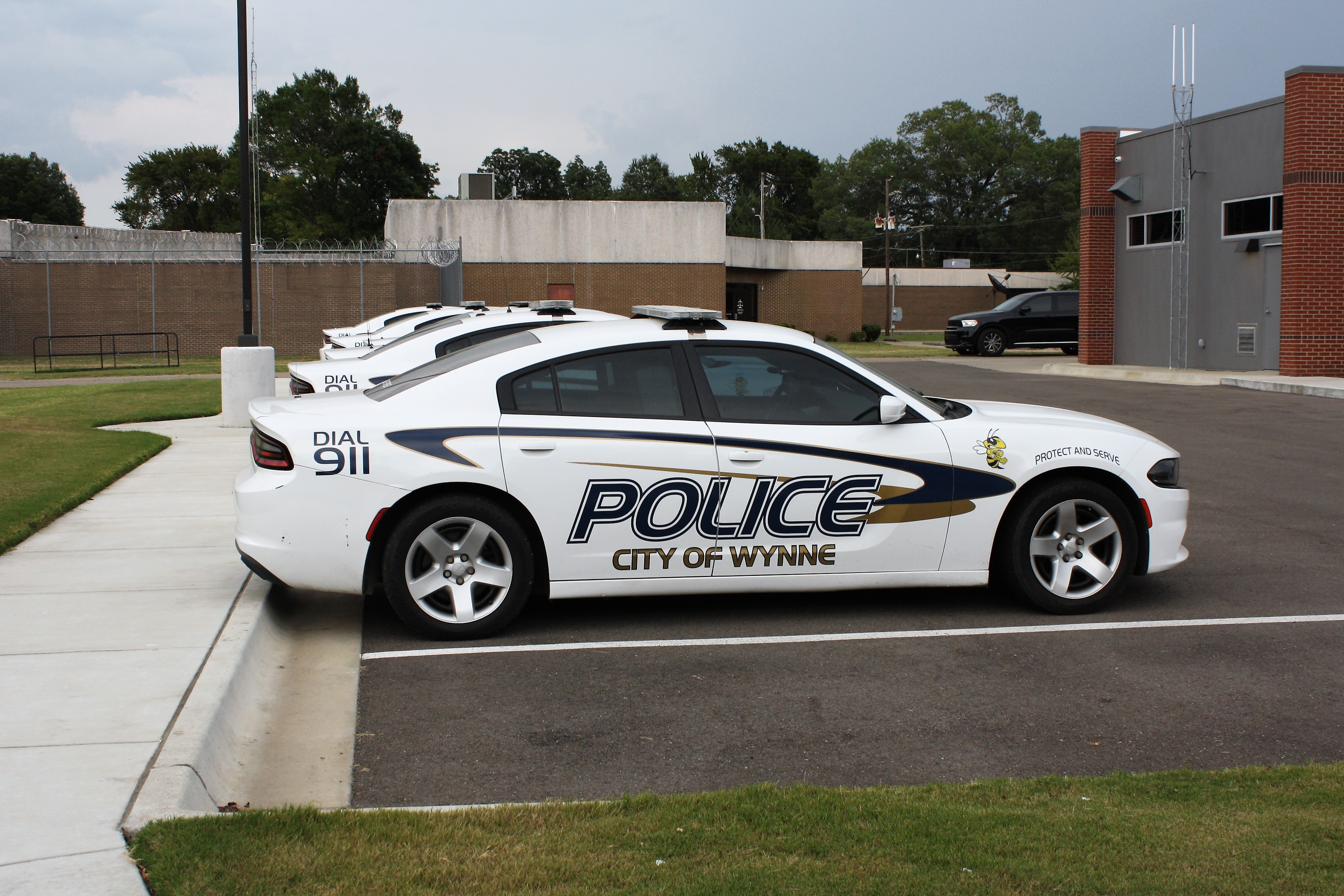
Wynne Police Department patrol car

The Cross County Sheriff's Office is the primary law enforcement agency in the county. The agency is led by the Cross County Sheriff, an official elected by countywide vote every four years. Police departments in Wynne and Cherry Valley provide law enforcement in their respective jurisdictions, with Hickory Ridge and Parkin contracting with the Cross County Sheriff's Office for law enforcement services.

The county is under the jurisdiction of the Cross County District Court, a local district court. Local district courts in Arkansas are courts of original jurisdiction for criminal, civil, small claims, and traffic matters. Local district courts are presided over by an elected part-time judge who may privately practice law. The district court has three departments: Cherry Valley, Parkin, and Wynne. In 2021, the court will be merged into the 25th District state district court, which includes St. Francis County.

Superseding district court jurisdiction is the 1st Judicial Circuit Court, which covers Cross, Lee, Monroe, Phillips, St. Francis, and Woodruff counties. The First Circuit contains five circuit judges, elected to six-year terms circuit wide.

Fire protection is provided by seven agencies in Cross County, together covering the entire county. The four incorporated municipalities provide fire protection beyond their corporate limits. Rural areas are served by the Bay Village Volunteer Fire Department, Fair Oaks Volunteer Fire Department, and Vanndale Volunteer Fire Department. All fire departments in Cross County are volunteer-based, except the Wynne Fire Department.

== Culture and contemporary life ==
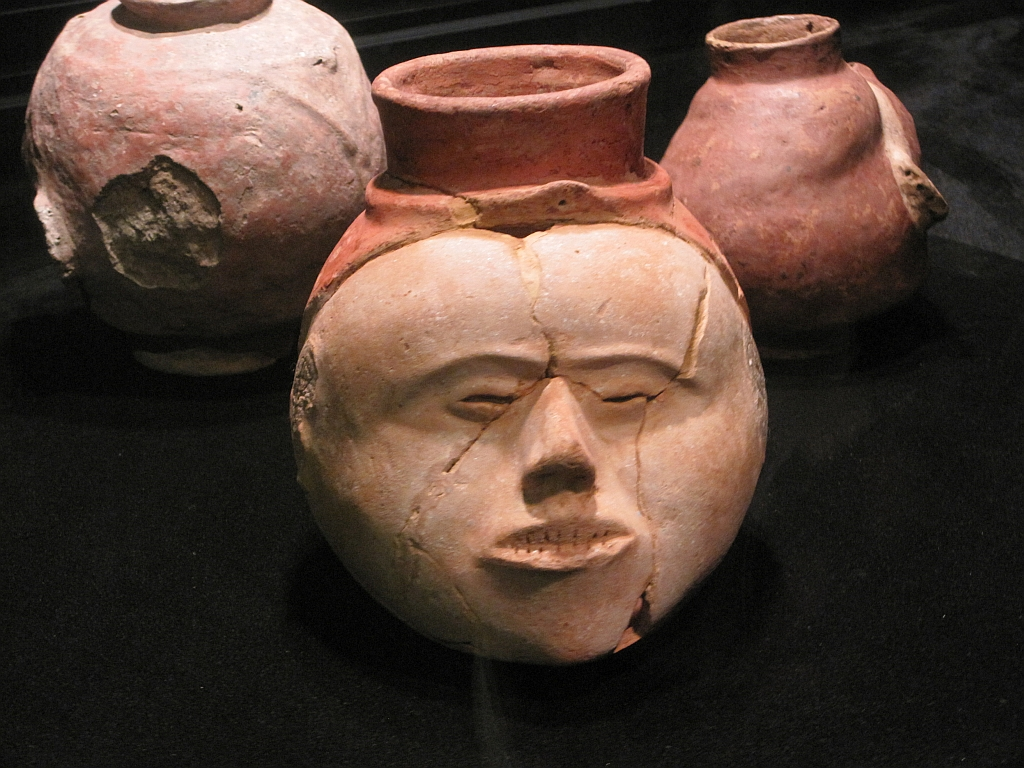
Native American pottery found nearby on display at Parkin Archaeological State Park

Cross County has several facilities, monuments, and museums dedicated to preserving the history and culture of the area. The Cross County Museum, owned and operated by the Cross County Historical Society, preserves and interprets the history and culture of Cross County for visitors. Cross County Historical Society also maintains the New Hope School outside Wynne.

Parkin contains remains of a historic palisaded village with one mound Late Mississippian village, today listed as a National Historic Landmark and interpreted via the Parkin Archeological State Park. Also in Parkin, the Northern Ohio School is a one-room school built by a lumber company to educate the children of African-American employees in the first half of the 20th century.

Wynne was the primary beneficiary of transportation improvements following the Reconstruction era, becoming a commercial hub for Cross County. Many of the historic structures in downtown Wynne were constructed during economically prosperous times on the farm, leading to the construction of ornate homes in the East Hamilton Avenue Historic District. The commercial centers are preserved as the Wynne Commercial Historic District and the Wynne Wholesale Commercial Historic District.

Other cultural points of interest in Cross County include:

- Grace Episcopal Church built in 1917
- The Woman's Progressive Club has housed the Woman's Progressive Club, Wynne's oldest social club since 1935

=== Media ===
The Wynne Progress and the Cross County Times are the county's two weekly newspapers. The county has had several former publications that have closed over the years, including newspapers published at Parkin and Wittsburg.

Cross County is within the Memphis designated market area with the following local TV stations: WREG (CBS), WMC (NBC), WKNO (PBS), WHBQ (Fox), WTWV, WATN (ABC), WLMT (The CW), WBUY, and WPXX (Ion TV).

The county is home to two radio stations: KWYN (92.5 FM) and sister station, KWYN (1400 AM).

== Government ==
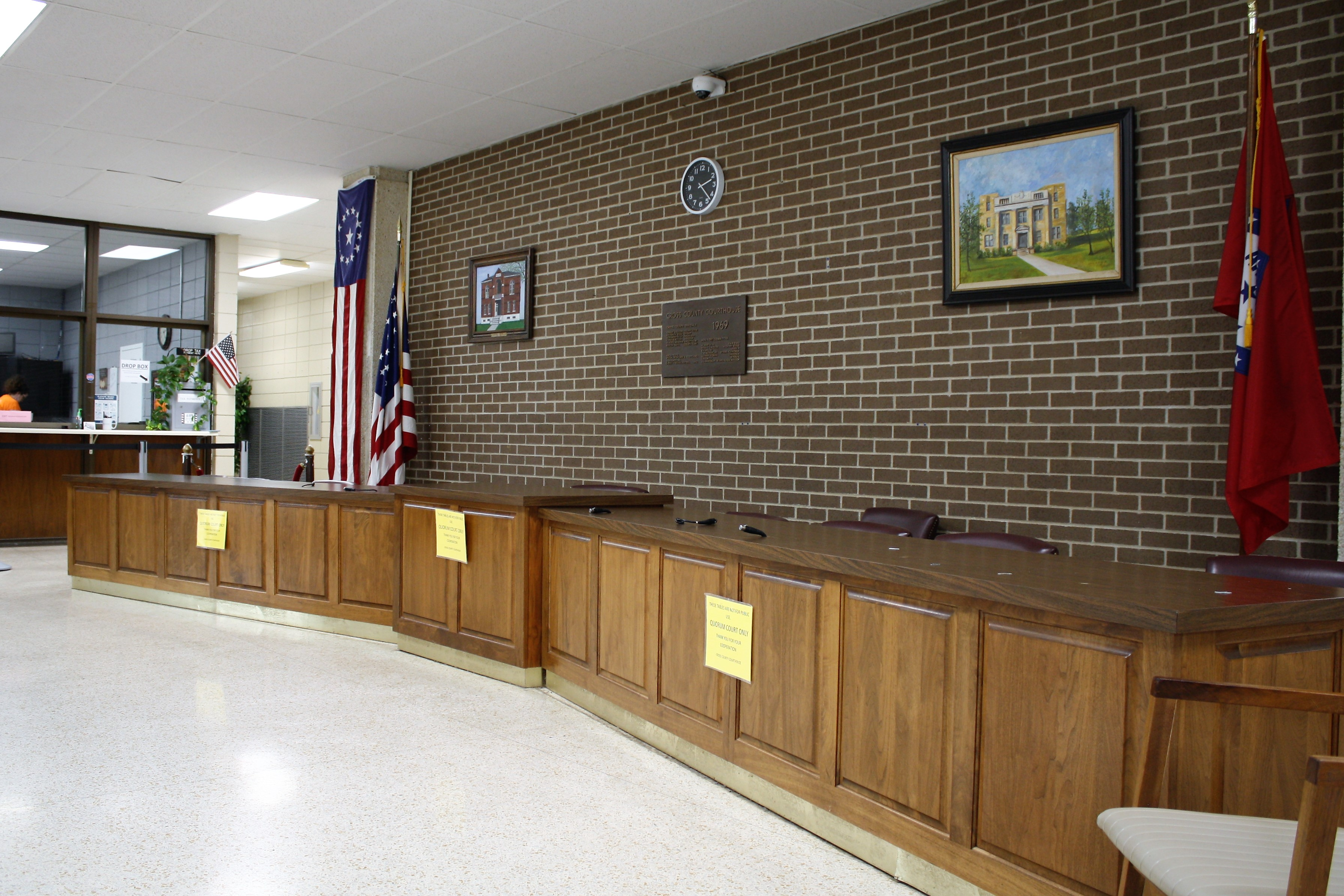
Cross County Quorum Court meeting place

The county government is a constitutional body granted specific powers by the Constitution of Arkansas and the Arkansas Code. The quorum court is the legislative branch of the county government and controls all spending and revenue collection. Representatives are called justices of the peace and are elected from county districts every even-numbered year. The number of districts in a county vary from nine to fifteen, and district boundaries are drawn by the county election commission. The Cross County Quorum Court has nine members. Presiding over quorum court meetings is the county judge, who serves as the chief executive officer of the county. The county judge is elected at-large and does not vote in quorum court business, although capable of vetoing quorum court decisions.

Cross County, Arkansas Elected countywide officials
Position	Officeholder	Party
County Judge	Lynn Blake	Republican
County Clerk	Mary Beth Sanders	Republican
Circuit Clerk	Rhonda Sullivan	Democratic
Sheriff	David West	Republican
Treasurer	Peg Hess	Republican
Collector	Kristy Davis	Republican
Assessor	Sherri Williams	Republican
Coroner	Eli Long	Republican

The composition of the Quorum Court after the 2024 elections is 8 Republicans and 1 Democrat. Justices of the Peace (members) of the Quorum Court following the elections are:

- District 1: Amy Imboden (R)
- District 2: John Kyle Wilson (R)
- District 3: Anthony Jarrett (R)
- District 4: Glenda Vance (R)
- District 5: Gloria Ferguson Aldridge (D)
- District 6: Kevin Jumper (R)
- District 7: Carl Loewer (R)
- District 8: Jay Gahr (R)
- District 9: Scott May (R)

Additionally, the townships of Cross County are entitled to elect their own respective constables, as set forth by the Constitution of Arkansas. Constables are largely of historical significance as they were used to keep the peace in rural areas when travel was more difficult. The township constables as of the 2024 elections are:

- District 1: Chris Bouland (R)
- District 2: Mark Sherman (R)
- District 3: Josh Orman (R)

=== Politics ===
Politically, Cross County has transitioned from reliably Democratic to steadily Republican since the mid-20th century. It has voted Republican by increasing margins in each presidential election from 2004 to 2024.

United States presidential election results for Cross County, Arkansas
Year	Republican		Democratic		Third party(ies)	
Year	No.	%	No.	%	No.	%
1896	224	19.77%	908	80.14%	1	0.09%
1900	312	32.74%	638	66.95%	3	0.31%
1904	321	32.79%	630	64.35%	28	2.86%
1908	507	39.83%	705	55.38%	61	4.79%
1912	293	26.71%	491	44.76%	313	28.53%
1916	252	21.37%	927	78.63%	0	0.00%
1920	457	34.00%	845	62.87%	42	3.13%
1924	192	21.08%	625	68.61%	94	10.32%
1928	324	20.12%	1,282	79.63%	4	0.25%
1932	87	4.02%	2,066	95.47%	11	0.51%
1936	133	7.40%	1,644	91.49%	20	1.11%
1940	285	14.00%	1,746	85.80%	4	0.20%
1944	452	20.71%	1,724	79.01%	6	0.27%
1948	213	9.40%	1,100	48.57%	952	42.03%
1952	1,461	38.28%	2,344	61.41%	12	0.31%
1956	1,176	34.42%	2,165	63.36%	76	2.22%
1960	1,287	35.60%	2,088	57.76%	240	6.64%
1964	2,147	46.88%	2,421	52.86%	12	0.26%
1968	1,093	19.16%	1,555	27.26%	3,056	53.58%
1972	3,743	72.78%	1,221	23.74%	179	3.48%
1976	1,909	31.11%	4,198	68.40%	30	0.49%
1980	2,895	44.59%	3,471	53.47%	126	1.94%
1984	3,917	59.04%	2,701	40.71%	17	0.26%
1988	3,186	51.29%	2,989	48.12%	37	0.60%
1992	2,303	32.97%	4,058	58.09%	625	8.95%
1996	2,000	32.47%	3,631	58.94%	529	8.59%
2000	3,033	48.80%	3,096	49.81%	86	1.38%
2004	3,864	54.62%	3,135	44.32%	75	1.06%
2008	4,393	61.61%	2,580	36.19%	157	2.20%
2012	4,269	63.90%	2,279	34.11%	133	1.99%
2016	4,584	66.69%	1,999	29.08%	291	4.23%
2020	4,946	71.25%	1,772	25.53%	224	3.23%
2024	4,753	72.74%	1,642	25.13%	139	2.13%

== Communities ==
=== Incorporated communities ===
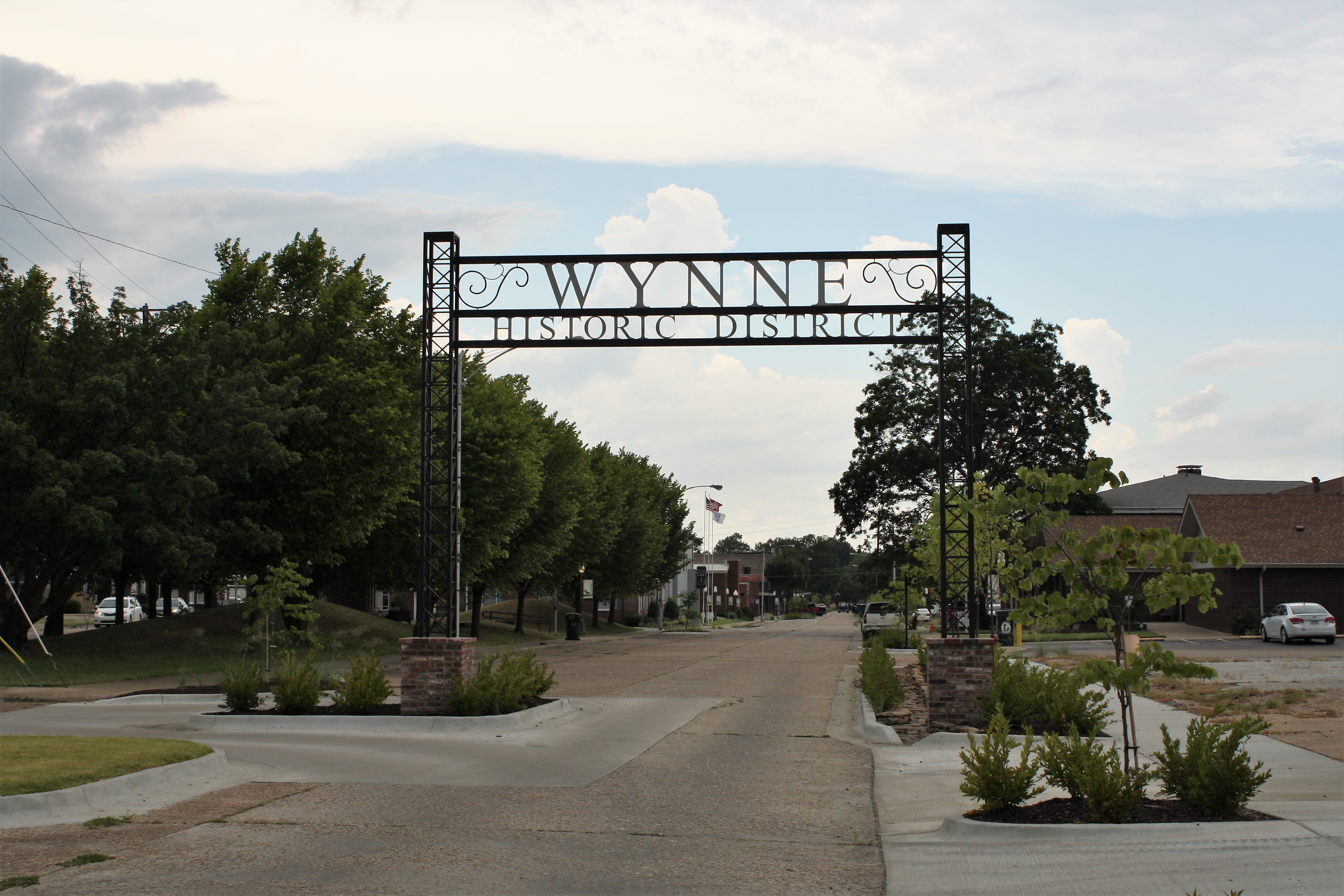
Entrance to downtown Wynne

- Cherry Valley
- Hickory Ridge
- Parkin
- Wynne (county seat)

=== Census-designated places ===
- Fair Oaks
- Vanndale

=== Unincorporated communities ===
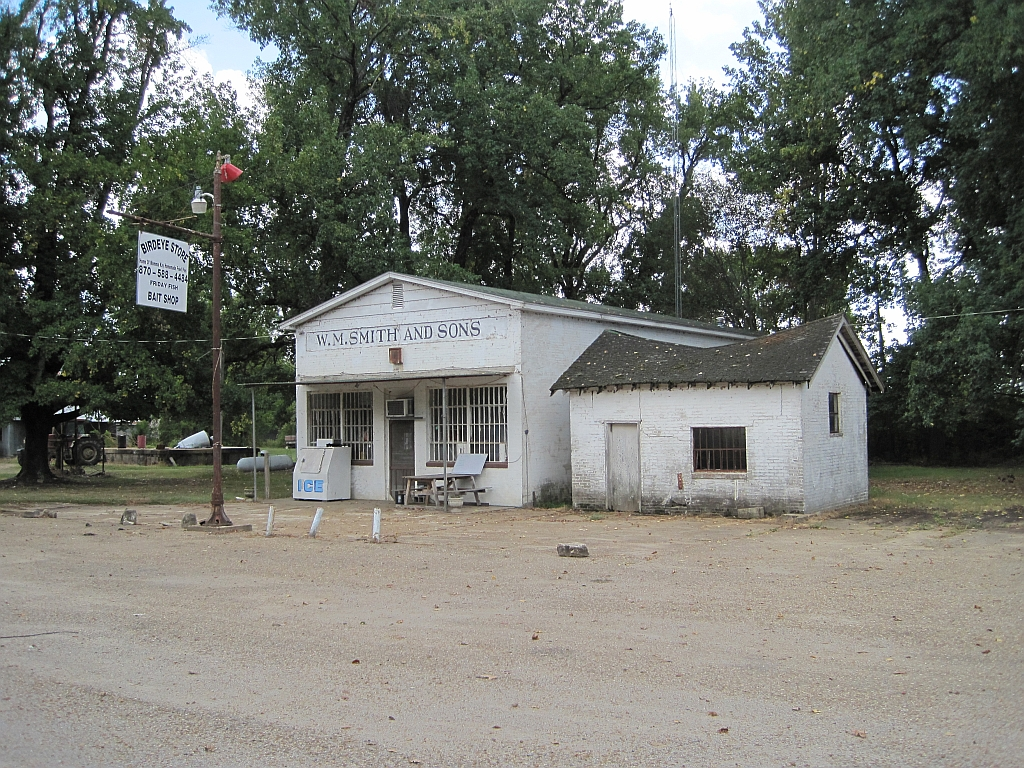
The W.M. Smith & Sons store was the historic center of the Birdeye community

- Bay Village
- Birdeye
- Central
- Coldwater
- Colton Crossing
- Duvall
- Ellis Chapel
- Fair Field
- Fitzgerald Crossing
- Flag Lake Crossing
- Gieseck
- Gladden
- Hamlin
- L'Anguille
- Levesque
- McDonald
- McElroy
- Mersman
- Monterey
- Mounds
- Pittinger
- Pleasant Hill
- Princedale
- River Front
- Riverside
- Rose Place
- Smith Chapel
- Smithdale
- Tilton
- Togo
- Twist
- Wick Mill
- Wilkins
- Wittsburg
- Yarbo Place

=== Historic communities ===
- Aberdeen
- Bellknap
- Budsmith
- Dunn
- Merck
- Saint Francis
- Turney
- Welford
- Wrape

=== Townships ===
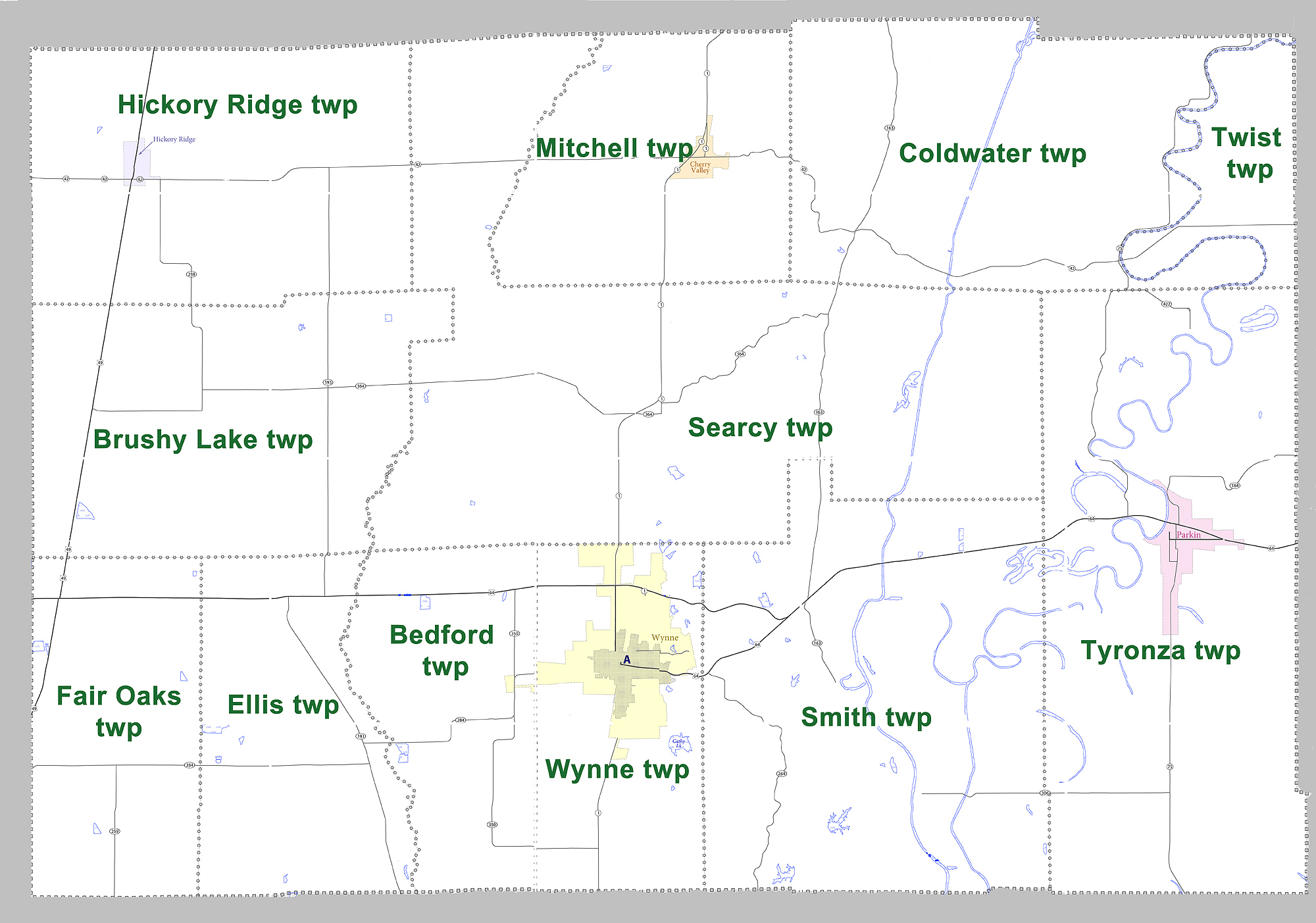
Townships in Cross County, Arkansas as of 2010

Townships in Arkansas are the divisions of a county. Each township includes unincorporated areas; some may have incorporated cities or towns within part of their boundaries. Arkansas townships have limited purposes in modern times. However, the United States census does list Arkansas population based on townships (sometimes referred to as "county subdivisions" or "minor civil divisions"). Townships are also of value for historical purposes in terms of genealogical research. Each town or city is within one or more townships in an Arkansas county based on census maps and publications. The townships of Cross County are listed below; listed in parentheses are the cities, towns, and/or census-designated places that are fully or partially inside the township.

- Bedford (small part of Wynne)
- Birdeye
- Brushy Lake
- Coldwater
- Ellis
- Fair Oaks
- Hickory Ridge (Hickory Ridge)
- Mitchell (Cherry Valley)
- Searcy
- Smith
- Smithdale
- Twist
- Tyronza (Parkin)
- Wynne (most of Wynne)

== Infrastructure ==
=== Major highways ===
- US 49 / US 63
- US 64
- AR 1
- AR 42
- AR 75
- AR 163 (Crowley's Ridge Parkway)
- AR 184
- AR 193
- AR 259
- AR 284
- AR 306
- AR 350
- AR 364

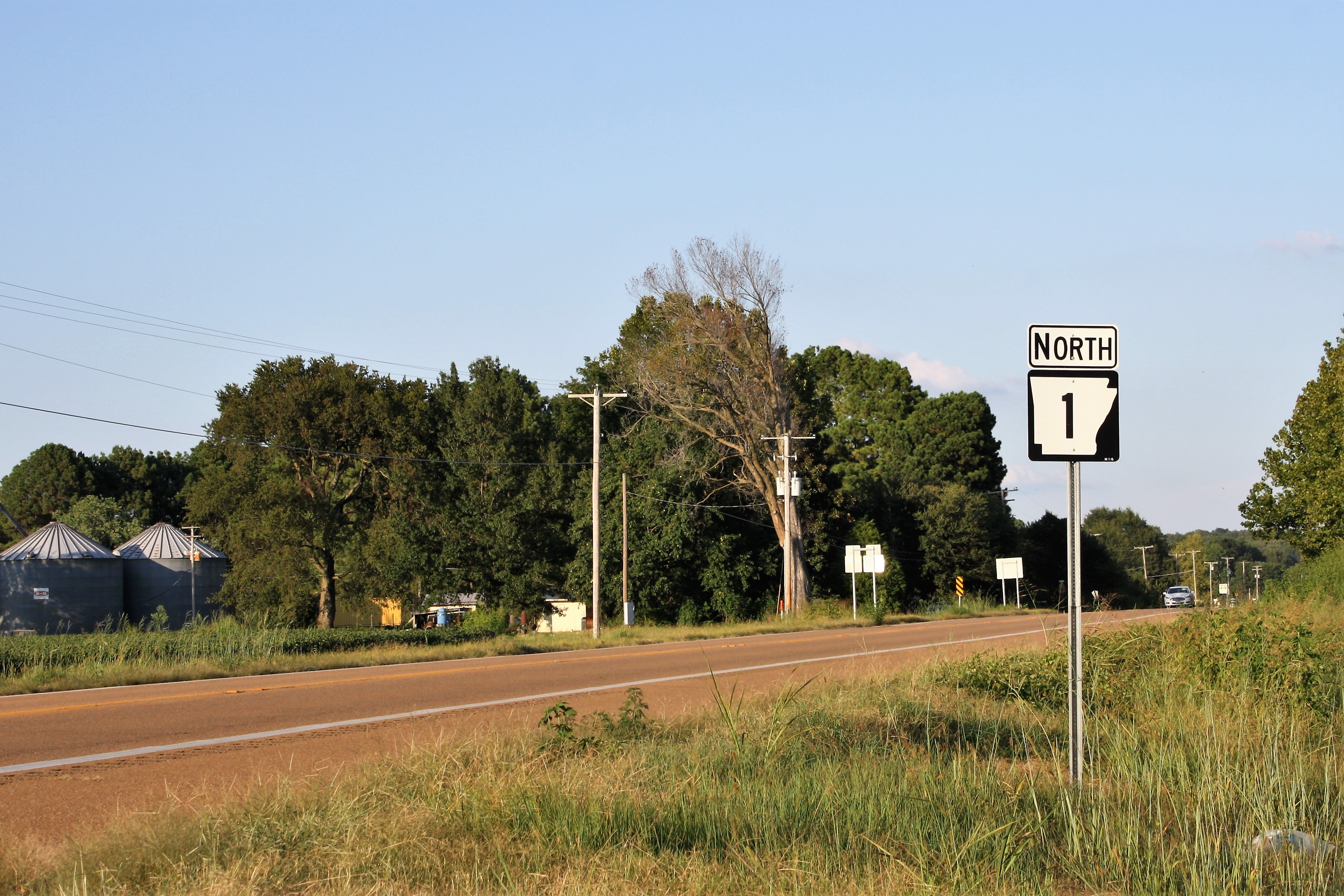
Highway 1B runs north as a rural highway in Vanndale

=== Utilities ===
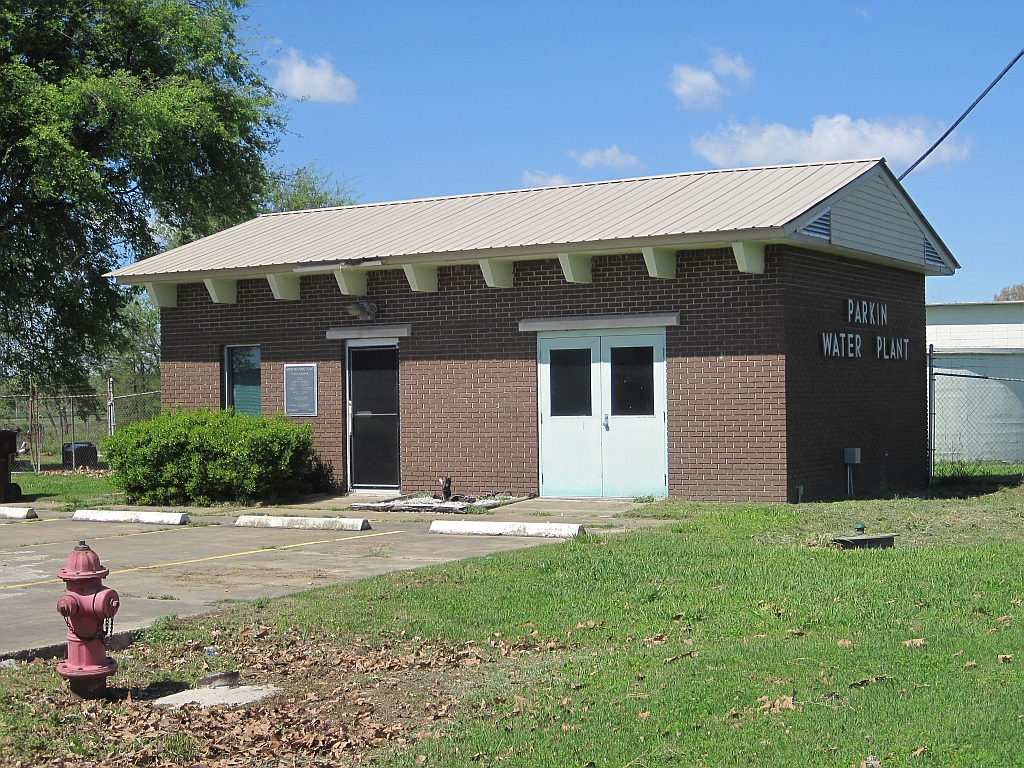
Parkin Water Company water treatment plant in Parkin

Entergy Arkansas is the sole provider of electricity in most of Cross County, with exception of an area northeast of Wynne roughly between Highway 1 and the St. Francis River, which is served by Woodruff Electric Cooperative. Telephone communication service is provided by AT&T, cable television is provided by East Arkansas Video. Centerpoint Energy is the natural gas utility in Cross County.

The Arkansas Department of Health (ADH) is responsible for the regulation and oversight of public water systems throughout the state. Cross County contains seven community water systems. Cross County Rural Water System is the largest by customer count (9276), though it extends into portions of five other counties. Wynne Water Utilities is largest by customers in Cross County (8837), followed by the Vanndale-Birdeye Water Association (2389). Cherry Valley Waterworks, Hickory Ridge Waterworks, Parkin Rural Water Association, and Parkin Water Company are all smaller water systems with under 1000 customers. All use groundwater from various aquifers as source water. (Note: The Parkin Rural Water Association purchases treated water in bulk from Parkin Water Company, whose source is groundwater.)

== See also ==
- List of lakes in Cross County, Arkansas
- National Register of Historic Places listings in Cross County, Arkansas
