= Wittsburg Store and Gas Station =

- U.S. National Register of Historic Places
- Location within Arkansas Location within the United States
- Location: Cty Rd 739, Wittsburg, Arkansas
- Coordinates: 35°13′5″N 90°42′0″W
- Area: less than one acre
- Built: 1930
- Architectural style: Plain traditional
- MPS: Arkansas Highway History and Architecture MPS
- NRHP reference No.: 00001386
- Added to NRHP: November 22, 2000

The Wittsburg Store and Gas Station is a historic retail establishment on Cross County Road 637 in Wittsburg, Arkansas. It is the only commercial building in the community. Built c. 1930, it is a single-story wood-frame structure with a gable roof and a false front. A shed-roof porch extends across the front, supported by for square posts. The main entrance is centered, flanked by sash windows. A gable-roofed section extends from the rear of the building, providing residential space for the shop, which occupies the main block. The building also features a concrete storm cellar, and there is a period gas pump to the building's southeast. The store operated from the 1930s to the 1980s, and is a reminder of Wittsburg's former status as a significant river town.

The store was listed on the National Register of Historic Places in 2000.

== See also ==
- National Register of Historic Places listings in Cross County, Arkansas
