= National Register of Historic Places listings in Cross County, Arkansas =

Location of Cross County in Arkansas

This is a list of the National Register of Historic Places listings in Cross County, Arkansas.

This is intended to be a complete list of the properties and districts on the National Register of Historic Places in Cross County, Arkansas, United States. The locations of National Register properties and districts for which the latitude and longitude coordinates are included below, may be seen in a map.

There are 19 properties and districts listed on the National Register in the county, including 1 National Historic Landmark. There are two formerly listed properties.

Contents: Counties in Arkansas
- Arkansas
- Ashley
- Baxter
- Benton
- Boone
- Bradley
- Calhoun
- Carroll
- Chicot
- Clark
- Clay
- Cleburne
- Cleveland
- Columbia
- Conway
- Craighead
- Crawford
- Crittenden
- Cross
- Dallas
- Desha
- Drew
- Faulkner
- Franklin
- Fulton
- Garland
- Grant
- Greene
- Hempstead
- Hot Spring
- Howard
- Independence
- Izard
- Jackson
- Jefferson
- Johnson
- Lafayette
- Lawrence
- Lee
- Lincoln
- Little River
- Logan
- Lonoke
- Madison
- Marion
- Miller
- Mississippi
- Monroe
- Montgomery
- Nevada
- Newton
- Ouachita
- Perry
- Phillips
- Pike
- Poinsett
- Polk
- Pope
- Prairie
- Pulaski (Little Rock)
- Randolph
- St. Francis
- Saline
- Scott
- Searcy
- Sebastian
- Sevier
- Sharp
- Stone
- Union
- Van Buren
- Washington
- White
- Woodruff
- Yell

This National Park Service list is complete through NPS recent listings posted November 6, 2026.

== Current listings ==
	Name on the Register	Image	Date listed	Location	City or town	Description
1	Isaac Block House		July 15, 1998 (#98000851)	404 E. Hamilton St. 35°13′35″N 90°47′19″W	Wynne	
3	East Hamilton Avenue Historic District	East Hamilton Avenue Historic District	June 8, 2011 (#11000330)	E. Hamilton Ave. between N. Falls Blvd. & N. Killough Rd.; Eldridge Ct. 35°13′31″N 90°48′51″W	Wynne	
4	Giboney-Robertson-Stewart House	Giboney-Robertson-Stewart House	June 5, 1998 (#98000585)	734 Hamilton Ave. 35°13′32″N 90°47′05″W	Wynne	
5	Grace Episcopal Church	Grace Episcopal Church	March 5, 1992 (#92000106)	614 E. Poplar St. 35°13′40″N 90°47′12″W	Wynne	
6	John H. Johnston Cotton Gin Historic District	John H. Johnston Cotton Gin Historic District	June 1, 2005 (#05000490)	Junction of U.S. Route 64 and Highway 163; 35°15′01″N 90°42′48″W	Levesque	
7	Memphis to Little Rock Road-Strong's Ferry Segment		May 15, 2012 (#12000274)	Address Restricted	Jennette vicinity	part of the Cherokee Trail of Tears Multiple Property Submission
8	Memphis to Little Rock Road-Village Creek Segment	Memphis to Little Rock Road-Village Creek Segment	April 11, 2003 (#03000193)	East of Lake Austell within Village Creek State Park; 35°08′48″N 90°43′00″W	Newcastle	A segment of the Trail of Tears
9	New Hope School	New Hope School	November 12, 2008 (#08001037)	3762 Highway 284; 35°12′26″N 90°43′56″W	Wynne	
10	Northern Ohio School	Northern Ohio School	May 23, 2014 (#14000247)	60 Highway 84N; 35°16′47″N 90°33′28″W	Parkin	
11	Servetus W. Ogan House	Servetus W. Ogan House	September 28, 2015 (#15000624)	504 E. Forrest Ave. 35°13′42″N 90°47′15″W	Wynne	
12	Parkin Indian Mound	Parkin Indian Mound	October 15, 1966 (#66000200)	Junction of U.S. Route 64 and Highway 184; 35°16′38″N 90°33′27″W	Parkin	
13	South Elementary School	South Elementary School	May 24, 2006 (#06000419)	711 E. Union Ave. 35°13′31″N 90°47′09″W	Wynne	
14	Wittsburg Fortification		December 31, 2002 (#02001626)	Address Restricted	Wittsburg	
15	Wittsburg Store and Gas Station		November 22, 2000 (#00001386)	County Road 739; 35°13′05″N 90°42′00″W	Wittsburg	
16	Woman's Progressive Club	Woman's Progressive Club	March 27, 1990 (#90000430)	Rowena St. and Merriman Ave. 35°13′25″N 90°47′21″W	Wynne	
17	Wynne Commercial Historic District	Wynne Commercial Historic District	December 22, 2009 (#09001115)	Roughly bounded by Front St., Commercial Ave., Terry St., Wilson St., and Pecan Ave. 35°13′23″N 90°47′30″W	Wynne	
18	Wynne Post Office	Wynne Post Office	August 14, 1998 (#98000914)	402 E. Merriman Ave. 35°13′27″N 90°47′21″W	Wynne	
19	Wynne Wholesale Commercial Historic District	Wynne Wholesale Commercial Historic District	January 25, 2010 (#09000772)	Corner of W. Merriman and Martin Luther King Dr. 35°13′28″N 90°47′38″W	Wynne	

== Former listing ==
	Name on the Register	Image	Date listed	Date removed	Location	City or town	Description
2	Capt. Isaac N. Deadrick House		September 16, 1993 (#93000964)	September 1, 2022	Northwest of the junction of U.S. Route 64 and Highway 163; 35°15′02″N 90°42′44″W	Levesque	
1	Missouri Pacific Depot		June 11, 1992 (#92000623)	September 17, 1999	Southwest of the junction of N. Front St. and E. Hamilton Ave.	Wynne	

== See also ==
- List of National Historic Landmarks in Arkansas
- National Register of Historic Places listings in Arkansas
