= Isaac Block House =

Historic house in Arkansas, United States

- U.S. National Register of Historic Places
- Location within Arkansas Location within the United States
- Location: 404 E. Hamilton St., Wynne, Arkansas
- Coordinates: 35°13′35″N 90°47′19″W
- Area: less than one acre
- Built: 1885
- Built by: Block, Isaac
- Architectural style: Queen Anne
- NRHP reference No.: 98000851
- Added to NRHP: July 15, 1998

The Isaac Block House is a historic house at 404 East Hamilton Street in Wynne, Arkansas. It is a 1 1/2-story wood-frame structure, locally notable for its fine Queen Anne styling. On the exterior this is evident in the wraparound porch, the use of fish-scale wood shingles, a projecting gable with carved decoration, and projecting bays that are similarly decorated. The house was built in Wittsburg in about 1885 by Isaac Block, a merchant son of German Jewish immigrants. After the railroad bypassed Wittsburg, Block decided to move the house to Wynne, a feat accomplished in the early 1900s by cutting the house into sections and hauling them on oversized wagons to the present location.

The house was listed on the National Register of Historic Places in 1998.

== See also ==
- National Register of Historic Places listings in Cross County, Arkansas
