= Wittsburg Fortification =

- U.S. National Register of Historic Places
- Nearest city: Wittsburg, Arkansas
- Area: less than one acre
- Built: 1863
- MPS: Little Rock Campaign of 1863 MPS
- NRHP reference No.: 02001626
- Added to NRHP: December 31, 2002

The Wittsburg Fortification is a defensive earthworks built during the American Civil War in Wittsburg, Arkansas. It is the only known surviving earthworks built by either side during the Union Army's advance on Little Rock in 1862. Union forces invaded Arkansas from Missouri on July 19, 1862, moving south along Crowley's Ridge, which lies west of the St. Francis River. By July 29 most of the division of General John Davidson had advanced as far as Wittsburg, where they established a camp to wait for supplies and reinforcements. A stockade and ditch were built on the ridge overlooking the area.

The fortification was listed on the National Register of Historic Places in 2002.

== See also ==
- National Register of Historic Places listings in Cross County, Arkansas
