= List of lakes of Cross County, Arkansas =

There are at least 39 named lakes and reservoirs in Cross County, Arkansas.

== Lakes ==
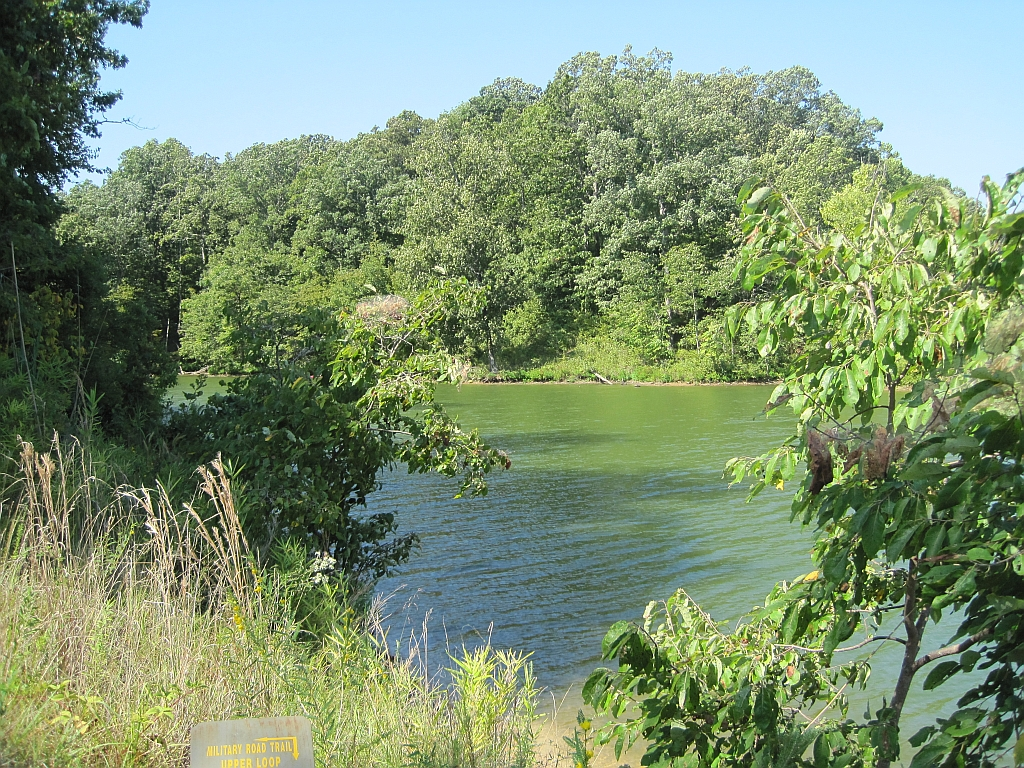
Lake Austell, Village Creek State Park

- Allens Lake, 35°09′53″N 090°39′05″W, el. 226 feet (69 m)
- Anderson Lake, 35°10′31″N 090°35′11″W, el. 203 feet (62 m)
- Barnes Lake, 35°17′26″N 090°35′18″W, el. 197 feet (60 m)
- Dog Pond, 35°10′27″N 090°37′11″W, el. 203 feet (62 m)
- Fishing Lake, 35°09′52″N 090°37′15″W, el. 200 feet (61 m)
- Grassy Lake, 35°11′02″N 090°38′43″W, el. 210 feet (64 m)
- Harris Pond, 35°26′07″N 090°30′25″W, el. 210 feet (64 m)
- Hill Lake, 35°09′08″N 090°36′08″W, el. 197 feet (60 m)
- Jack Lake, 35°08′48″N 090°34′02″W, el. 203 feet (62 m)
- Little Blackfish Lake, 35°13′15″N 090°30′49″W, el. 190 feet (58 m)
- Neelys Lake, 35°13′10″N 090°34′40″W, el. 203 feet (62 m)
- Old River, 35°13′56″N 090°36′48″W, el. 194 feet (59 m)
- Patterson Lake, 35°08′50″N 090°33′27″W, el. 194 feet (59 m)
- Prophet Lake, 35°14′26″N 090°34′42″W, el. 213 feet (65 m)
- Rainbow Lake, 35°11′00″N 090°36′21″W, el. 200 feet (61 m)
- Shaver Lake, 35°14′29″N 090°32′57″W, el. 203 feet (62 m)
- Shell Lake, 35°08′23″N 090°29′41″W, el. 197 feet (60 m)
- Snowden Lake, 35°10′49″N 090°35′43″W, el. 207 feet (63 m)
- Swan Lake, 35°19′48″N 090°34′26″W, el. 197 feet (60 m)
- Walnut Timber Lake, 35°10′59″N 090°35′08″W, el. 207 feet (63 m)
- Wittsburg Lake, 35°11′24″N 090°40′37″W, el. 184 feet (56 m)
- Yancopin Lake, 35°11′03″N 090°38′18″W, el. 200 feet (61 m)

== Reservoirs ==
- Caney Creek Site One Reservoir, 35°17′35″N 090°46′03″W, el. 295 feet (90 m)
- Caney Creek Site Two Reservoir, 35°15′48″N 090°46′24″W, el. 299 feet (91 m)
- Caney Creek Site 3a Reservoir, 35°15′20″N 090°45′32″W, el. 308 feet (94 m)
- Caney Creek Site Four Reservoir, 35°14′48″N 090°46′00″W, el. 331 feet (101 m)
- Caney Creek Site Five Reservoir, 35°14′36″N 090°46′00″W, el. 344 feet (105 m)
- Caney Creek Site Six Reservoir, 35°13′42″N 090°46′00″W, el. 348 feet (106 m)
- Caney Creek Site Seven Reservoir, 35°11′55″N 090°46′01″W, el. 292 feet (89 m)
- Cathy Lake, 35°11′57″N 090°46′18″W, el. 295 feet (90 m)
- Cooper Pond, 35°24′13″N 090°58′47″W, el. 226 feet (69 m)
- Gardner Lake, 35°16′05″N 090°46′02″W, el. 335 feet (102 m)
- Hall Lake, 35°15′24″N 090°46′18″W, el. 302 feet (92 m)
- Hidden Valley, 35°13′12″N 090°43′18″W, el. 354 feet (108 m)
- Hunter Rest Club Lake, 35°14′52″N 090°43′49″W, el. 285 feet (87 m)
- Lake Austell, 35°09′10″N 090°43′24″W, el. 312 feet (95 m)
- Lake Dunn, 35°10′14″N 090°42′03″W, el. 358 feet (109 m)
- Pufahl Reservoir, 35°21′00″N 090°51′24″W, el. 230 feet (70 m)
- Robinson Lake, 35°15′47″N 090°44′01″W, el. 331 feet (101 m)

== See also ==
- List of lakes in Arkansas
