= Servetus W. Ogan House =

Historic house in Arkansas, United States

- U.S. National Register of Historic Places
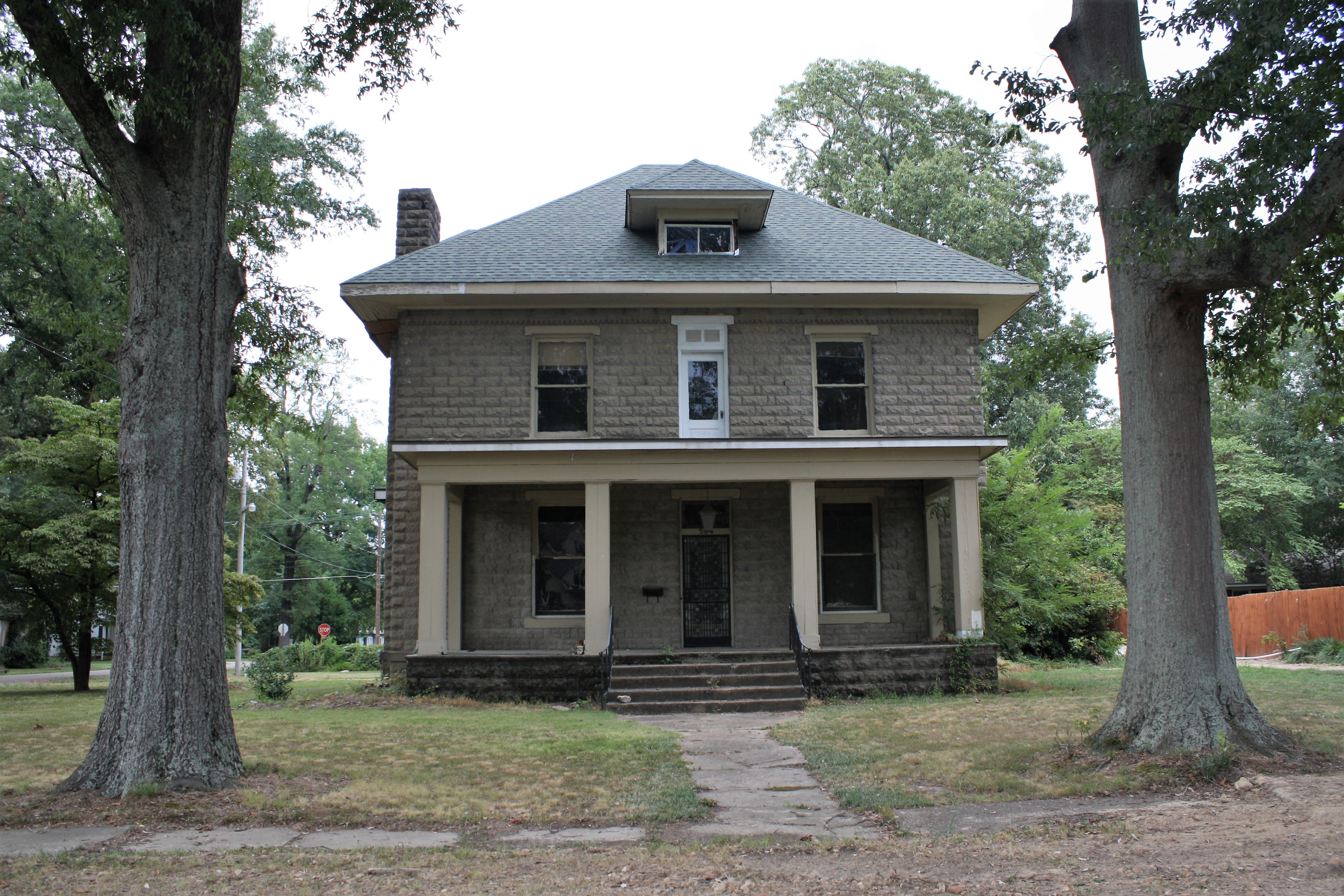

- Location within Arkansas Location within the United States
- Location: 504 E. Forrest Ave., Wynne, Arkansas
- Coordinates: 35°13′42″N 90°47′15″W
- Area: less than one acre
- Built: 1910
- Architectural style: American Foursquare
- NRHP reference No.: 15000624
- Added to NRHP: September 28, 2015

The Servetus W. Ogan House is a historic house at 504 East Forrest Avenue in Wynne, Arkansas. It is a two-story American Foursquare building, built out of rusticated concrete blocks in 1910. It has a hip roof with hipped dormers, and a projecting single-story porch supported by square columns. It is one of the city's few examples of residential concrete-block construction, a style that was briefly popular in the area.

The house was listed on the National Register of Historic Places in 2015.

== See also ==
- National Register of Historic Places listings in Cross County, Arkansas
