= Woman's Progressive Club =

- U.S. National Register of Historic Places
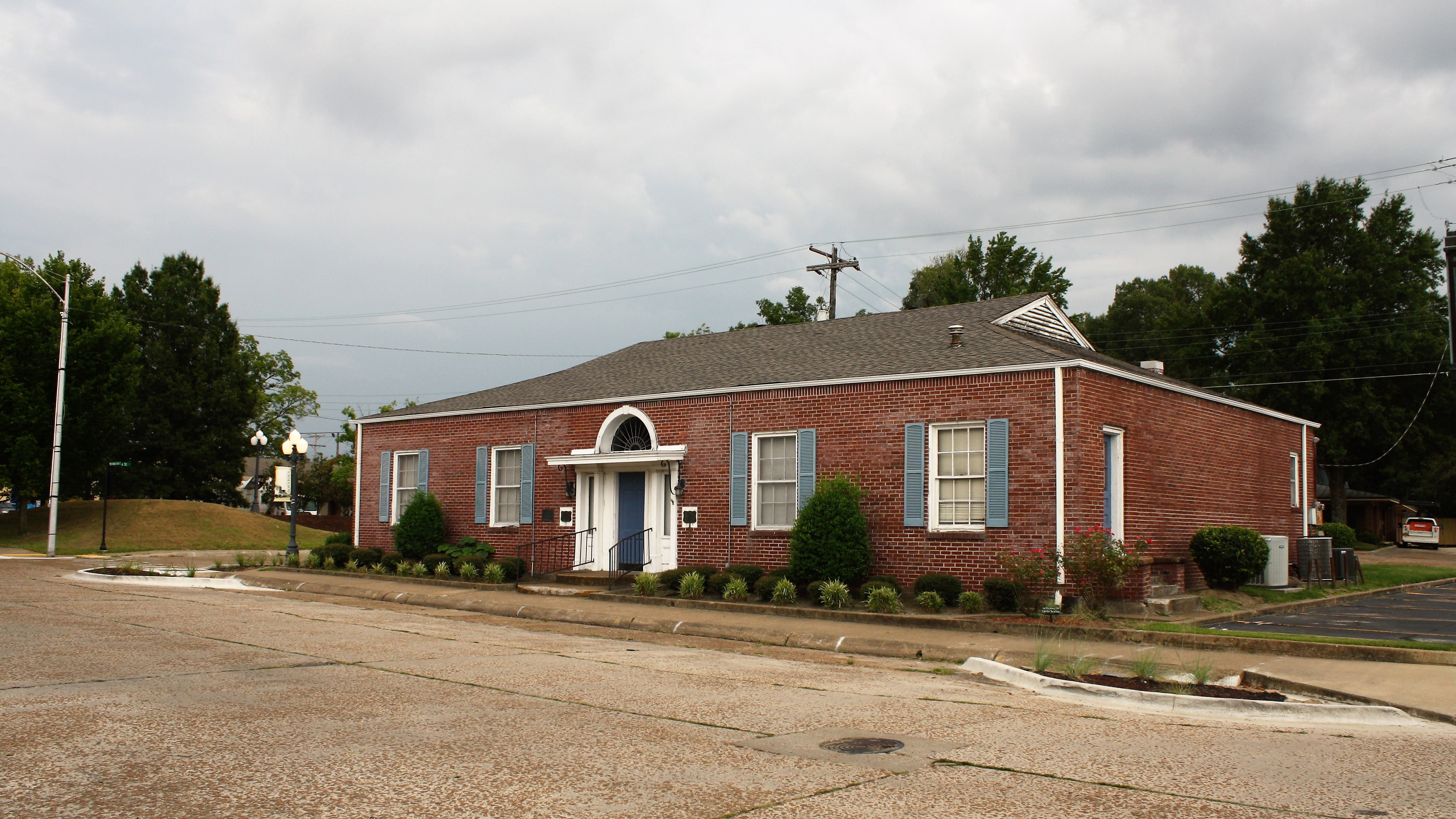

- Location within Arkansas Location within the United States
- Location: Rowena St. and Merriman Ave., Wynne, Arkansas
- Coordinates: 35°13′25″N 90°47′21″W
- Area: less than one acre
- Built: 1935
- Built by: Works Progress Administration
- Architectural style: Colonial Revival, Bungalow/craftsman
- NRHP reference No.: 90000430
- Added to NRHP: March 27, 1990

The Woman's Progressive Club is a historic meeting hall at the southwest corner of Rowena Street and Merriman Avenue in Wynne, Arkansas. It is a single-story brick structure, with a gable-on-hip roof. It was built in the 1930s with funding from the Works Progress Administration, and is a relatively ornate example of Colonial Revival architecture. The hall, whose interior largely consists of an auditorium with stage, was built for Cross County's oldest social organization, the Woman's Progressive Club, which was founded in 1913. The hall has long been a local venue for public, private, and civic events, and is the finest performance space in the city.

The building was listed on the National Register of Historic Places in 1990.

== See also ==
- National Register of Historic Places listings in Cross County, Arkansas
