= South Elementary School =

- U.S. National Register of Historic Places
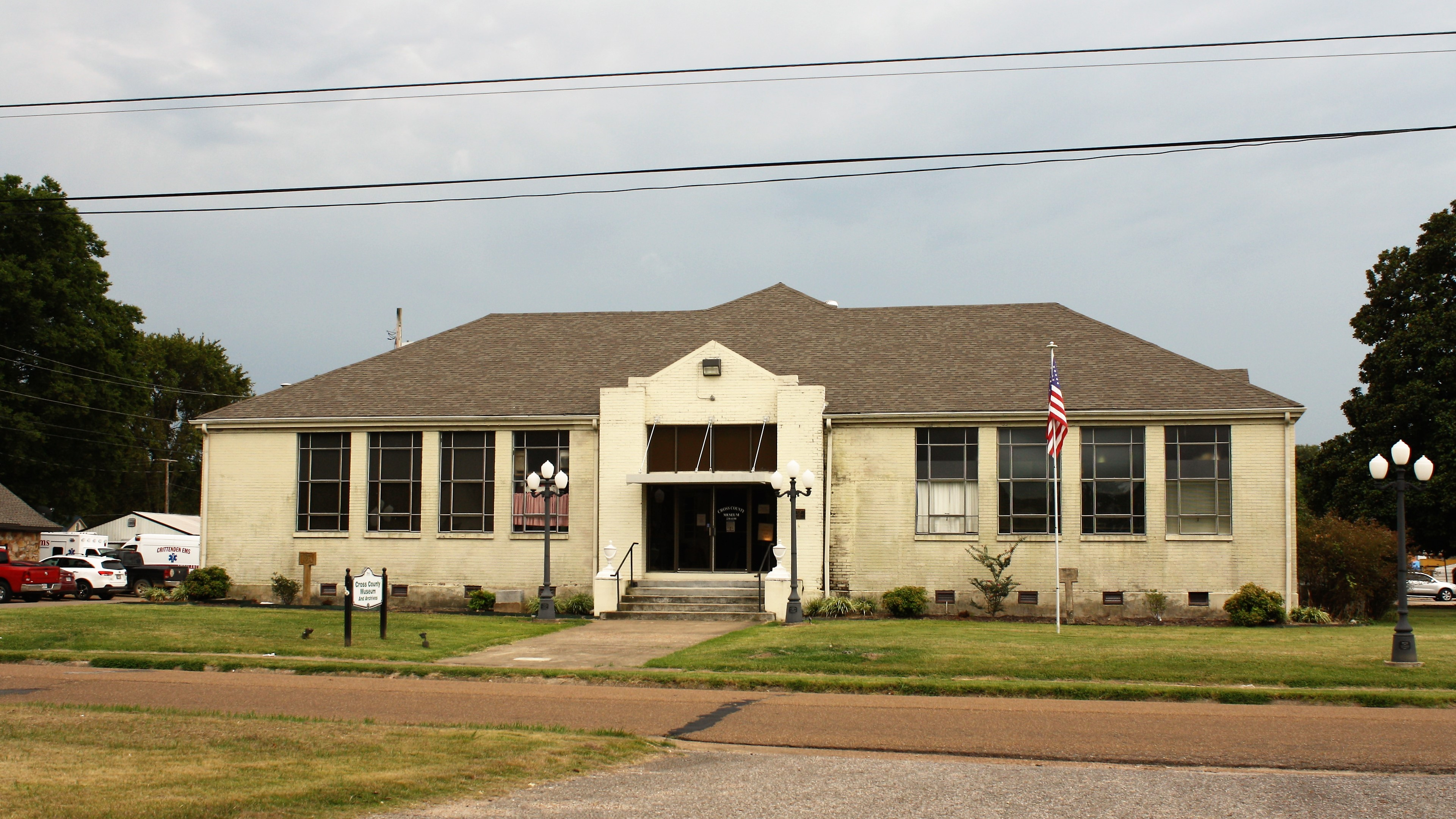

- Location within Arkansas Location within the United States
- Location: 711 E. Union Ave., Wynne, Arkansas
- Coordinates: 35°13′31″N 90°47′9″W
- Area: less than one acre
- Built by: Public Works Administration
- Architectural style: Plain traditional
- NRHP reference No.: 06000419
- Added to NRHP: May 24, 2006

The South Elementary School is a historic school building at 711 East Union Avenue in Wynne, Arkansas. It is a single-story brick building, with a hip roof. It has a T-shape, with a broad rectangular front and a projecting section to the rear. This building is the only surviving element of a larger complex of school facilities built on the site in the 1930s with funding from the Public Works Administration. The entire complex was purchased by Cross County in 1968, at which time all of the other 1930s buildings were torn down. The school building was adapted for use as a mental health clinic in 1971.

The building was listed on the National Register of Historic Places in 2006.

== See also ==
- National Register of Historic Places listings in Cross County, Arkansas
