= Wynne Post Office =

United States historic post office

- U.S. National Register of Historic Places
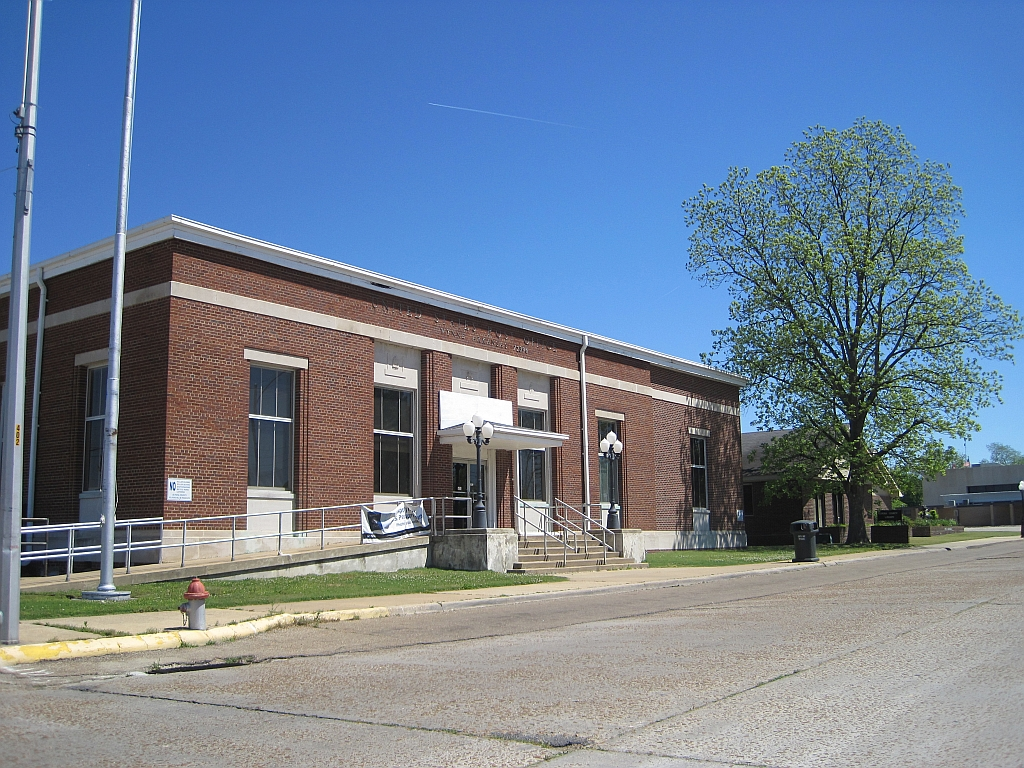

- Location within Arkansas Location within the United States
- Location: 402 E. Merriman Ave., Wynne, Arkansas
- Coordinates: 35°13′27″N 90°47′21″W
- Area: less than one acre
- Built: 1936
- Architect: Ethel Magafan, et al.
- Architectural style: Art Deco
- MPS: Post Offices with Section Art in Arkansas MPS
- NRHP reference No.: 98000914
- Added to NRHP: August 14, 1998

The Wynne Post Office is located at 402 East Merriman Street in Wynne, Arkansas. It is a single-story brick structure, with a built-up parapet obscuring a flat roof. A recent addition extends to the rear. The building was built in 1936 at a cost to the federal government of $65,000. It is most notable for the mural that adorns its main lobby, titled Cotton Pickers, which was created by Ethel Magafan with funding from the United States Treasury Department's Section of Art, a Depression-era jobs program for artists.

The building was listed on the National Register of Historic Places in 1998.

== See also ==
- National Register of Historic Places listings in Cross County, Arkansas
- List of United States post offices
- List of United States post office murals
