= New Hope School (Wynne, Arkansas) =

- U.S. National Register of Historic Places
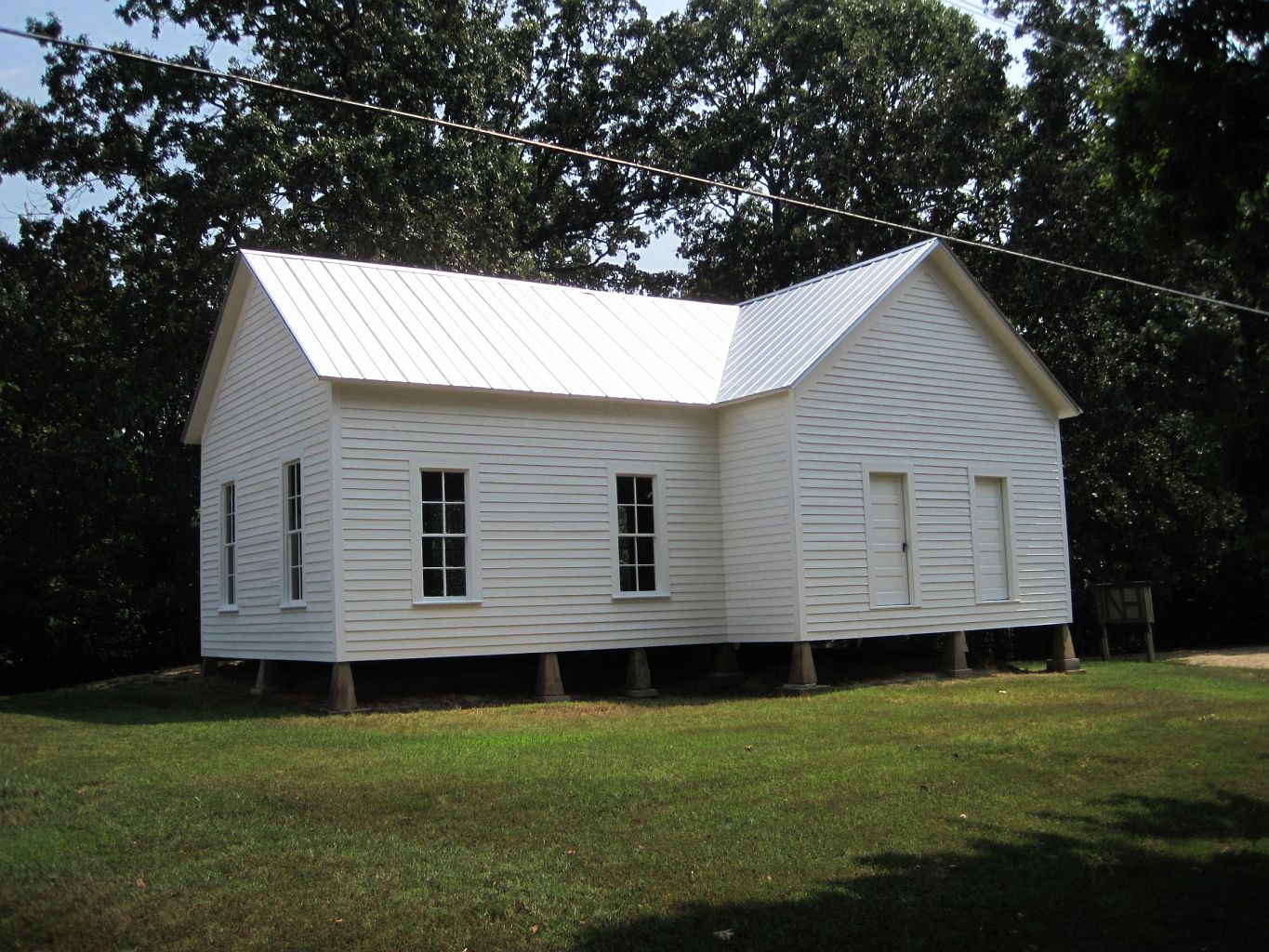

- Location within Arkansas Location within the United States
- Nearest city: Wynne, Arkansas
- Coordinates: 35°12′32″N 90°43′55″W
- Area: 1 acre (0.40 ha)
- Built: 1903
- Architectural style: Plain-Traditional
- NRHP reference No.: 08001037
- Added to NRHP: November 12, 2008

The New Hope School is a historic schoolhouse at 3762 Arkansas Highway 284, east of Wynne, Arkansas. It is a single-story wood-frame structure with simple Plain-Traditional style, which was built in stages. In 1903 a single-room schoolhouse was built to serve the students of District 25, to which a second classroom was added sometime before 1930, resulting in the building's present appearance. This building was used as a school until 1951, after which it was purchased by a local peach farmer for use in his business. In 2007 the building was donated to the Cross County Historical Society, which has overseen its restoration.

The building was listed on the National Register of Historic Places in 2008.

It was a one-room schoolhouse before it was a two-room schoolhouse.

== See also ==
- National Register of Historic Places listings in Cross County, Arkansas
