= Wynne Commercial Historic District =

Historic district in Arkansas, United States

- U.S. National Register of Historic Places
- U.S. Historic district
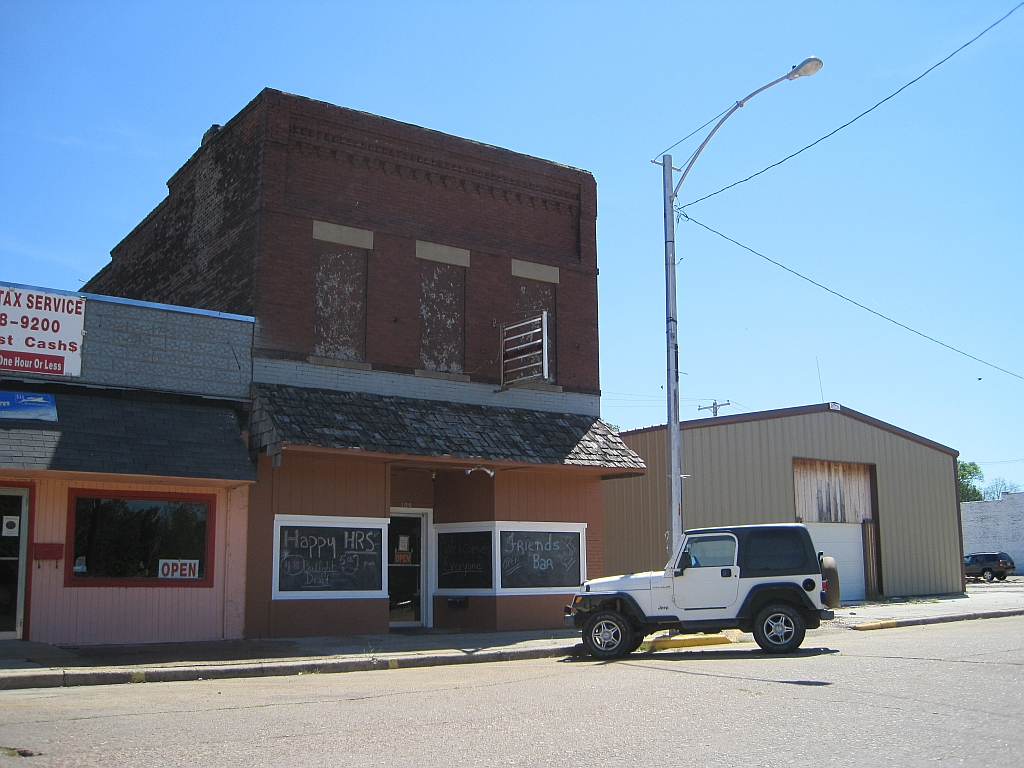
- Buildings on Front Street

- Location within Arkansas Location within the United States
- Location: Roughly bounded by Front St., Commercial Ave., Terry St., Wilson St., and Pecan Ave., Wynne, Arkansas
- Coordinates: 35.22394°N 90.79155°W
- Area: 15 acres (6.1 ha)
- Built: 1891
- Architectural style: Late 19th And Early 20th Century American Movements, Late Victorian
- NRHP reference No.: 09001115
- Added to NRHP: December 22, 2009

The Wynne Commercial Historic District encompasses the historic early 20th century business district of Wynne, Arkansas. It is bounded on the west by Front Street, on the north by East Commercial Street, on the south by East Pecan Street, and roughly on the east by South Wilson, East Union, and South Terry Streets. This area was developed beginning with the arrival of the railroad in 1882, but a fire destroyed most of the center in 1887. Consequently, most of the development in this area began in 1891 and was mostly built out by 1959. The architecture in this area is largely early 20th-century brick commercial architecture, with some buildings exhibiting stylistic flourishes from the Italianate, Mediterranean, and Romanesque Revivals.

The district was listed on the National Register of Historic Places in 2009.

== See also ==
- National Register of Historic Places listings in Cross County, Arkansas
