= John H. Johnston Cotton Gin Historic District =

Historic district in Arkansas, United States

- U.S. National Register of Historic Places
- U.S. Historic district
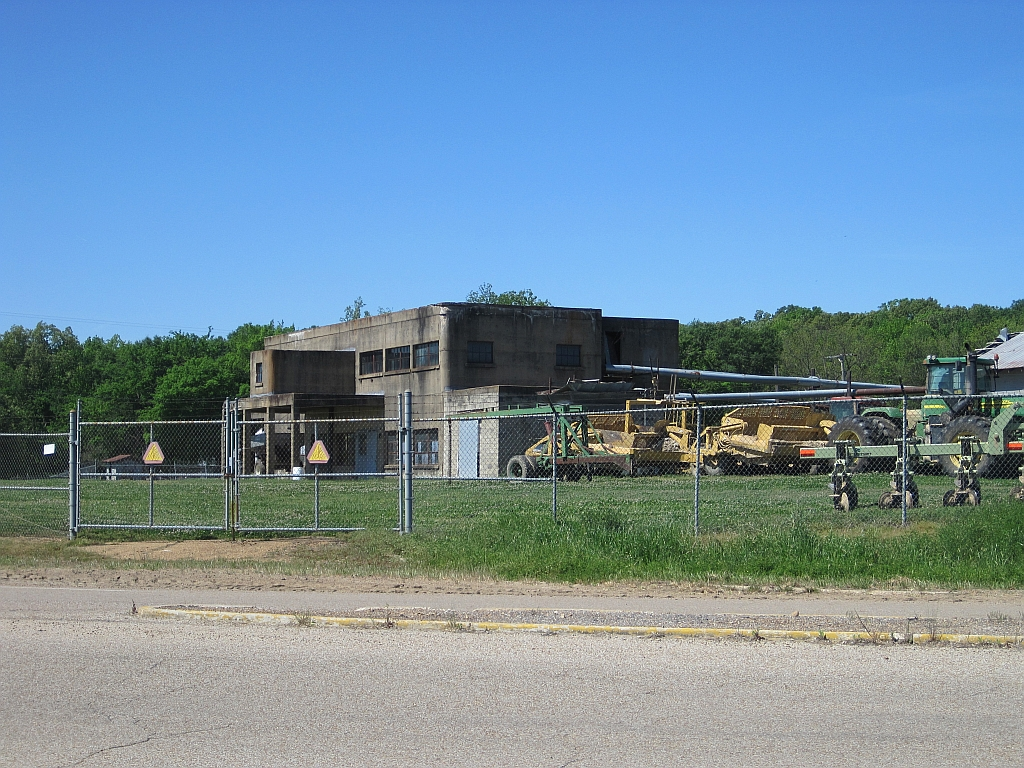

- Location within Arkansas Location within the United States
- Location: Jct. US 64 & AR 163, Levesque, Arkansas
- Coordinates: 35°15′1″N 90°42′48″W
- Area: 2.8 acres (1.1 ha)
- Built: 1941
- Built by: John H. Johnston
- Architectural style: Moderne, Plain Traditional
- MPS: Cotton and Rice Farm History and Architecture in the Arkansas Delta MPS
- NRHP reference No.: 05000490
- Added to NRHP: June 1, 2005

The John H. Johnston Cotton Gin Historic District encompasses a historic cotton gin in the small community of Levesque, Arkansas. The main building of the gin was built in 1941, and was built out of reinforced concrete, instead of the more usual steel, owing to a metal shortage in World War II. It has some Moderne styling, with smooth surfaces and rounded corners. The gin also distinctively incorporates a seed storage facility at its rear. Its ancillary structures, which include a shed, privy, and cyclone structure, are wood-framed with metal siding and roofing.

The gin was listed on the National Register of Historic Places in 2005.

== See also ==
- National Register of Historic Places listings in Cross County, Arkansas
