= Grace Episcopal Church (Wynne, Arkansas) =

Historic church in Arkansas, United States

- U.S. National Register of Historic Places
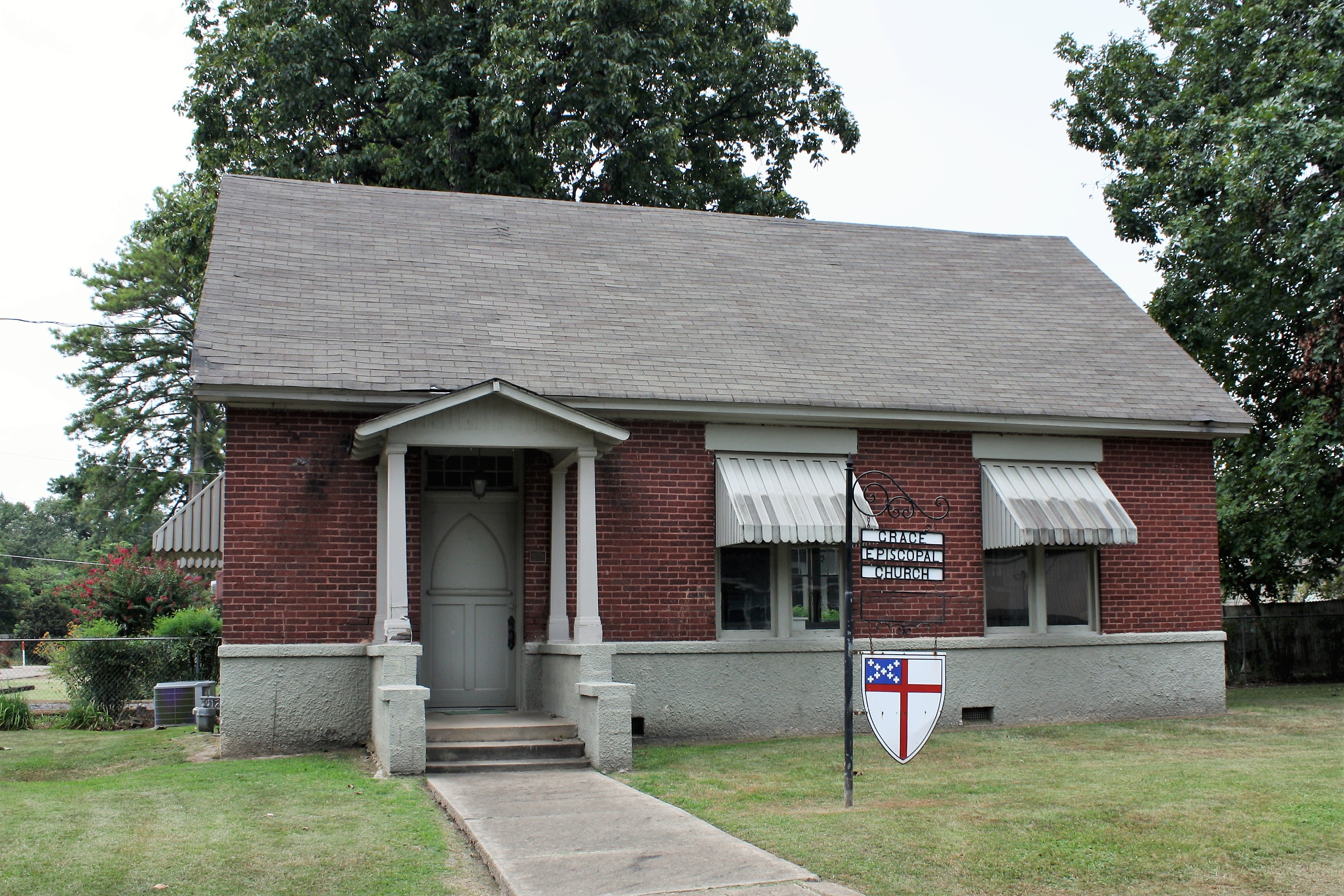

- Location within Arkansas Location within the United States
- Location: 614 E. Poplar St., Wynne, Arkansas
- Coordinates: 35°13′40″N 90°47′12″W
- Area: less than one acre
- Architectural style: Colonial Revival, Bungalow/craftsman
- NRHP reference No.: 92000106
- Added to NRHP: March 5, 1992

Grace Episcopal Church is a historic church at 614 E. Poplar Street in Wynne, Arkansas. It is an architecturally eclectic single-story brick structure, built in 1917 for a newly formed congregation. It was built in part with materials donated by the Missouri-Pacific Railroad, which was then on a major depot-building campaign. The church is a distinctive regional example of an English country church, albeit with some Colonial Revival and Craftsman flourishes, and is relatively unaltered since its construction.

The building was listed on the National Register of Historic Places in 1992. It was heavily damaged in a 2023 tornado. The former congregation was part of the Episcopal Diocese of Arkansas.

== See also ==
- National Register of Historic Places listings in Cross County, Arkansas
