= Arkansas Highway 184 =

State highway in Arkansas, United States

Highway 184

Route information
- Maintained by ArDOT
- Length: 7.30 mi (11.75 km)
- Existed: June 23, 1965–present

Major junctions
- West end: US 64 in Parkin
- East end: US 64 in Earle

Location
- Country: United States
- State: Arkansas
- Counties: Cross, Crittenden

Highway system
- Arkansas Highway System; Interstate; US; State; Business; Spurs; Suffixed; Scenic; Heritage
← AR 183	→ AR 185

Highway 184 (AR 184, Ark. 184, and Hwy. 184) is an east–west state highway in the Arkansas Delta. The route begins at US Highway 64 (US 64) in Parkin and runs east 7.30 miles (11.75 km) to US 64 in Earle. The route is maintained by the Arkansas Department of Transportation (ArDOT).

== Route description ==
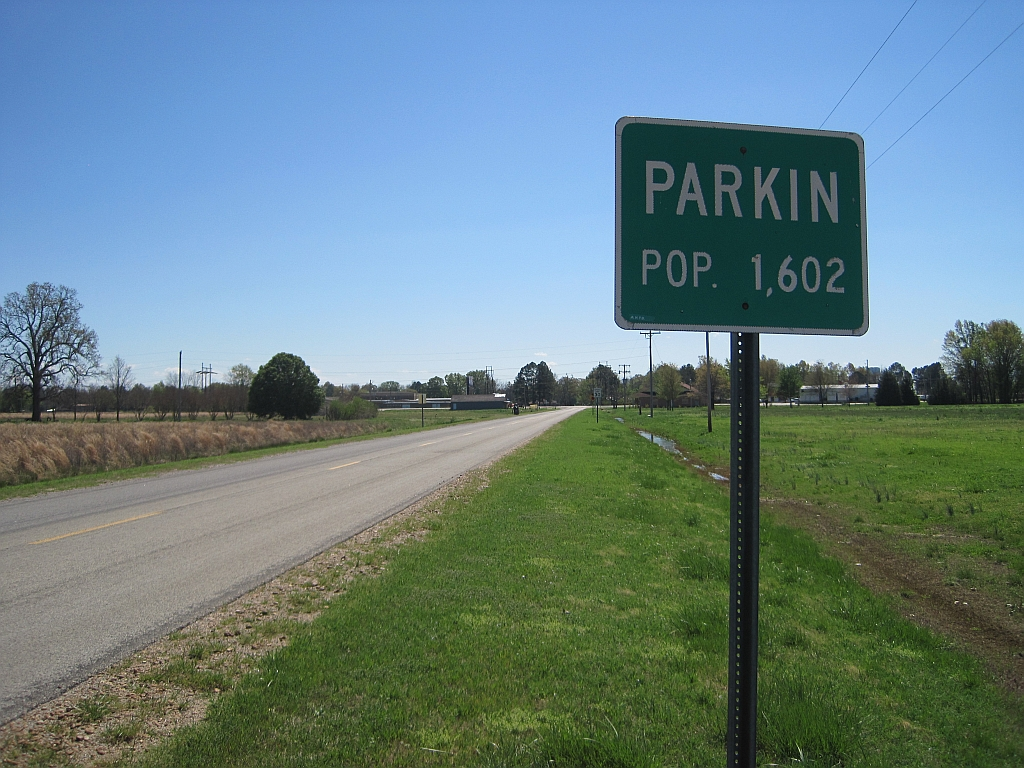
Highway 184 enters Parkin near Parkin Archaeological State Park

Highway 184 begins at US 64 near Parkin Archaeological State Park, a state park dedicated to preserve Indian mounds. The route runs north past the historic Northern Ohio School, crossing the Tyronza River very near its mouth at the St. Francis River before turning east. It passes through agricultural areas, crossing into Crittenden County and crossing the Tyronza River again. Highway 184 enters Earle, a small Delta town with an agricultural economy, before terminating at US 64.

== History ==
The highway was created by the Arkansas State Highway Commission (ASHC) on June 23, 1965 from US 64 in Parkin to the east along a county road. A second route was created from US 64 at Norvell (Note: Norvell was an incorporated town in Crittenden County adjacent to Earle until annexation into Earle in 1978.) in Crittenden County west across the Tyronza River on May 23, 1973 during a period of highway system expansion. The second highway was created pursuant to Act 9 of 1973 passed by the Arkansas General Assembly. The act directed county judges and legislators to designate up to 12 miles (19 km) of county roads as state highways in each county. The western route was also extended to the Cross-Crittenden county line during the meeting. Nine months later, the gap was closed between the Norvell route and the county line, creating a continuous highway.

== Major intersections ==
County	Location	mi	km	Destinations	Notes
Cross	Parkin	0.00	0.00	US 64 – Memphis, Wynne	Western terminus
Crittenden	Earle	7.30	11.75	US 64 – Earle, Parkin	Eastern terminus
1.000 mi = 1.609 km; 1.000 km = 0.621 mi
