= East Arkansas Community College =

Public community college in Forrest City, Arkansas, U.S.

Coordinates: 35°02′31″N 90°46′05″W

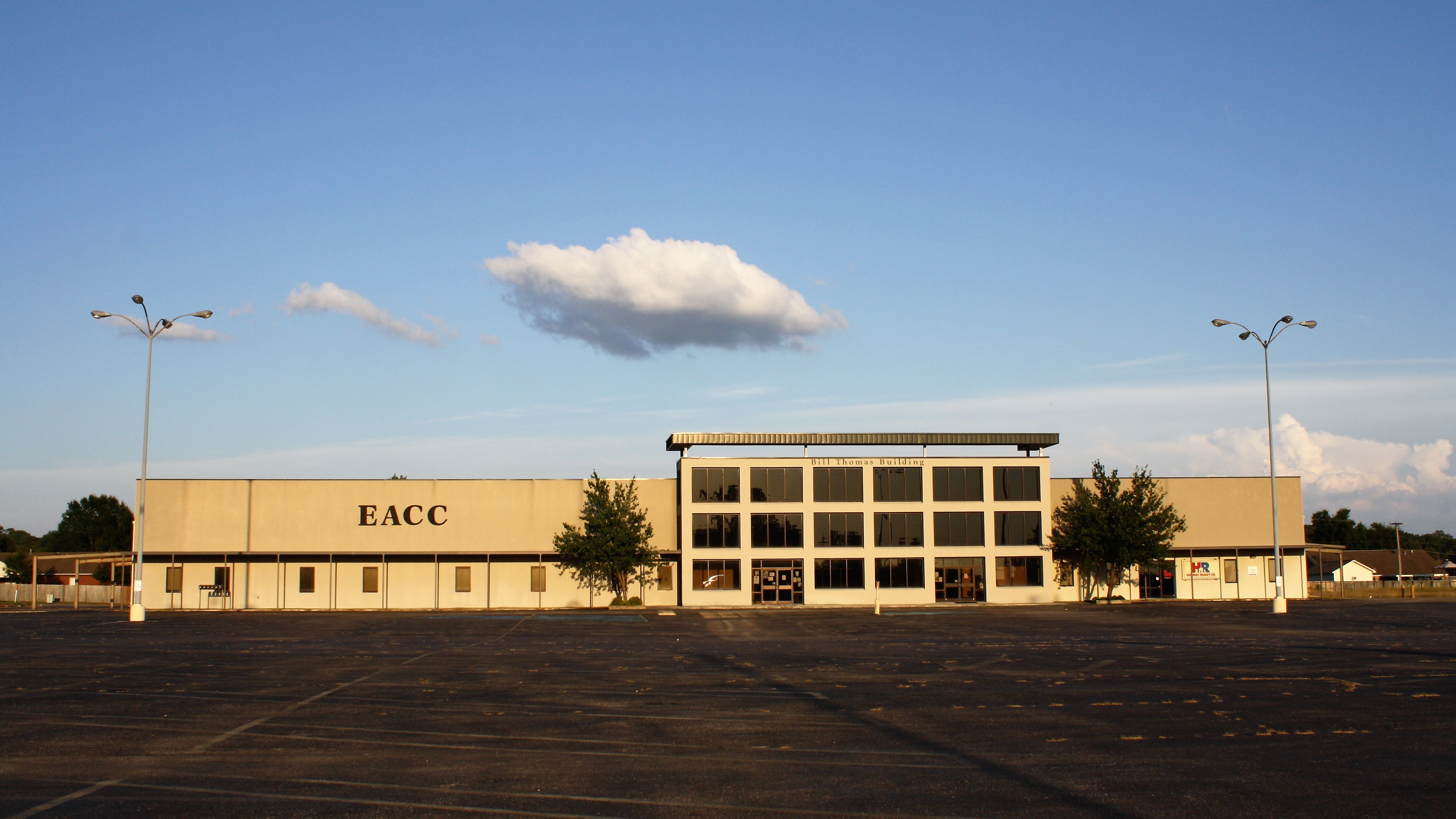
Wynne Campus

East Arkansas Community College (EACC) is a public community college in Forrest City, Arkansas. EACC provides higher education at its main campus in Forrest City as well as one satellite location in Wynne.

EACC is accredited by the Higher Learning Commission. Its primary service area includes Cross, Lee, Monroe, St. Francis, and Woodruff counties.

== History ==
In 1968, citizens of St. Francis County created a college committee out of a desire and need for a community college. At the time, the closest schools were in Memphis, Tennessee, and Jonesboro, Arkansas. The Crowley's Ridge Community College Corporation received approval for its initial charter the following year.

In 1971, Betty Jo Hodges donated $25,000 to the organization enabling it to purchase approximately 40 acres of land in Forrest City, Arkansas. Two years later, the Arkansas Board of Higher Education announced that St. Francis County had met the requirements necessary to form a community college district. On November 8 of the same year, voters approved the proposal to initiate a four-mill tax to finance construction of the college.

The college began holding classes on August 26, 1974. It had 684 students enrolled for its initial semester.

In 2005, the school opened an extension center in Wynne, Arkansas.

In 2017, the Arkansas General Assembly passed Act 636, which laid out the process for merging EACC and the nearby Crowley's Ridge Technical Institute (CRTI). On July 31, 2017, the Arkansas Higher Education Coordinating Board voted for the merger, and EACC assumed the property, personnel, and funding of CRTI.

=== Presidents ===
- Horace E. Hartsell (1974)
- Coy Grace (1998 - 2008)
- Cathie Cline (2018–Present)

== Arts and culture ==
EACC has a performing arts center located on campus which opened in 2010. The center is a 33,000 square foot center and is designated as a 'Class A' performance hall, one of only three in the entire state of Arkansas. It features a 1,100-seat auditorium, 2,900 square foot stage, banquet hall, kitchen, black box theater, and art gallery.

Notable performers at EACC have included:

- Air Supply
- The Commodores
- Crystal Gayle

== Student life ==
Under the department of Office of Student Activities, the colleges has a variety of clubs and organizations which students can become members of and participate in their activities.

== Athletics ==
EACC students participate in intramural sports against other ADLI colleges year-round in the following sports:

- Basketball
- Flag Football
- Softball
- Volleyball

EACC holds an annual golf tournament and held its 10th annual one in 2021. Some of the sponsors included Arkansas Concrete Company, Boar's Head, Forrest City Medical Center, and Johnson Controls. All proceeds from the annual tournament support the EACC Foundation which helps students.
