= Wynne Wholesale Commercial Historic District =

Historic district in Arkansas, United States

- U.S. National Register of Historic Places
- U.S. Historic district
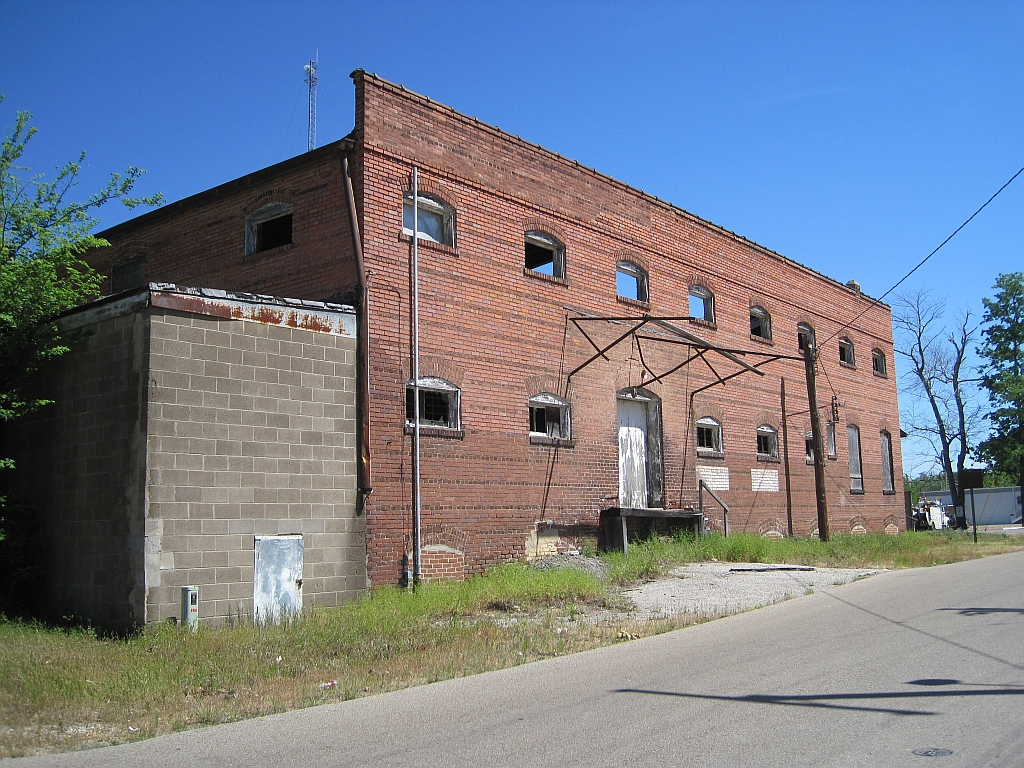

- Location within Arkansas Location within the United States
- Location: Corner of W. Merriman Ave. & Martin Luther King Dr., Wynne, Arkansas
- Coordinates: 35°13′35″N 90°47′40″W
- Area: 5 acres (2.0 ha)
- Built: 1905
- Architectural style: Early Commercial, water tower and cotton gin
- NRHP reference No.: 09000772
- Added to NRHP: January 25, 2010

The Wynne Wholesale Commercial Historic District encompasses a small collection of historic commercial properties in Wynne, Arkansas. It extends for two blocks along West Merriman Avenue, west of Martin Luther King Jr. Boulevard, and includes four historic buildings: the Wynne Municipal Water Works, the Wynne Wholesale Grocer Company building, the R. J. Jackson Gin Company's cotton gin, and the Sharp Floral Building. A fifth building, the Wynne Ice & Coal Company's ice house, also stands in the district, but has been recently modified. These building are representative of wholesale business activities that took place in Wynne in the first half of the 20th century.

The district was listed on the National Register of Historic Places in 2010.

== See also ==
- National Register of Historic Places listings in Cross County, Arkansas
