= Northern Ohio School =

- U.S. National Register of Historic Places
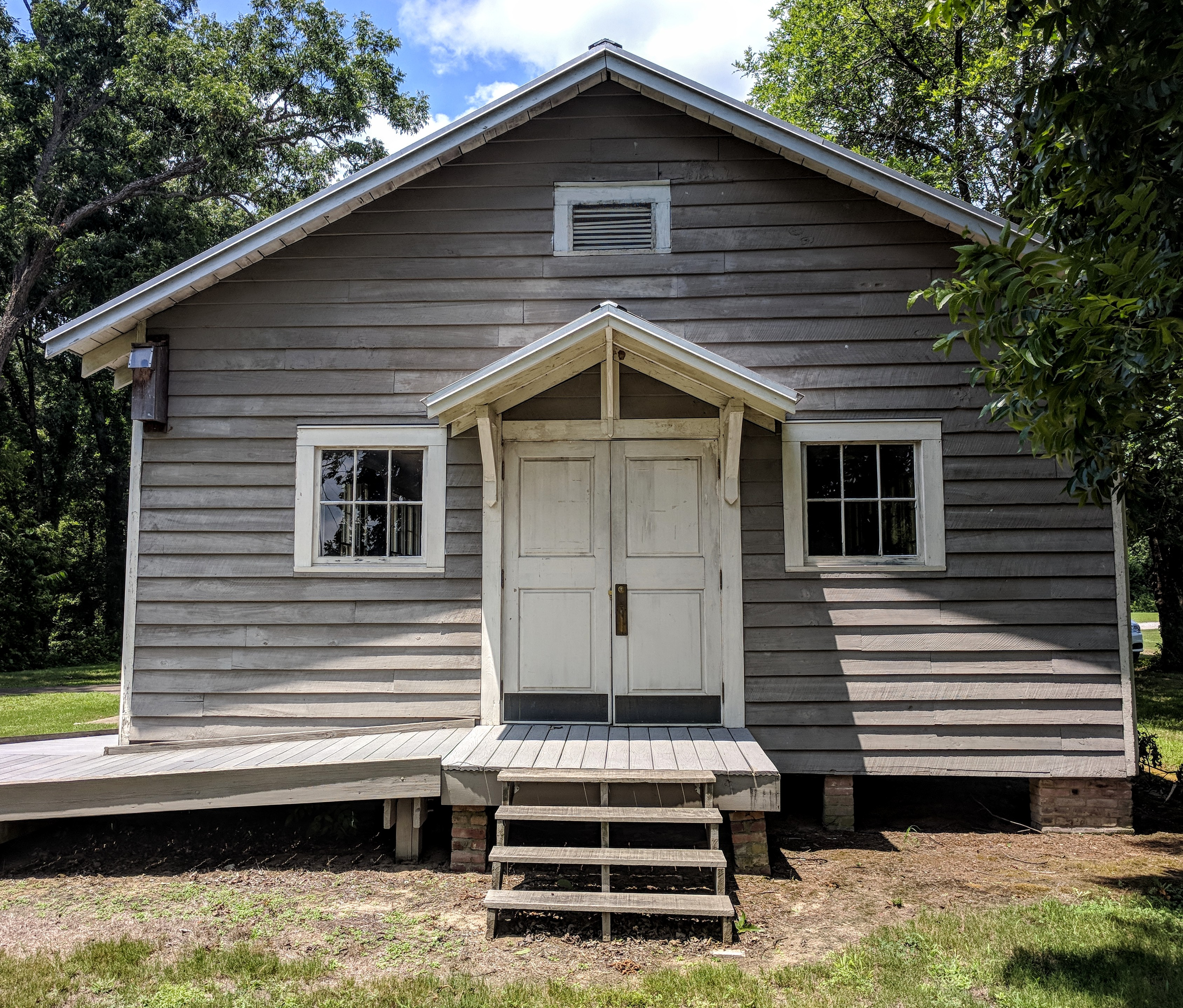

- Location within Arkansas Location within the United States
- Nearest city: Parkin, Arkansas
- Coordinates: 35°16′47″N 90°33′28″W
- Area: 1 acre (0.40 ha)
- Built: 1910
- Architectural style: Plain-Traditional
- NRHP reference No.: 14000247
- Added to NRHP: May 23, 2014

The Northern Ohio School is a historic school building at 60 Arkansas Highway 184 in Parkin, Arkansas. It is a small wood-frame structure, clad in clapboards, with a corrugated metal roof, set on the south side of the highway just beyond the northern boundary of Parkin Archeological State Park. The school was built c. 1910 by the Northern Ohio Cooperage and Lumber Company as an educational facility for the children of its African-American workers. The building was converted to a residence in 1951 after the company closed down its operations. It was sold to the state, as a buffer property for the adjacent park, in 1998.

The building was listed on the National Register of Historic Places in 2014.

It appears to be a one-room schoolhouse building.

== See also ==
- National Register of Historic Places listings in Cross County, Arkansas
