= Wittsburg, Arkansas =

- Unincorporated community
- Location within Arkansas Location within the United States
- Coordinates: 35°13′08″N 90°42′06″W
- Country: United States
- State: Arkansas
- County: Cross
- Elevation: 256 ft (78 m)
- Time zone: UTC-6 (Central (CST))
  - Summer (DST): UTC-5 (CDT)
- Area code: 870
- GNIS feature ID: 58904

Wittsburg is an unincorporated community in Cross County, Arkansas, United States. Wittsburg is located on the St. Francis River and at the southern terminus of Arkansas Highway 163, 4.8 miles (7.7 km) east of Wynne.

Wittsburg was created as a port city as the northernmost navigable point for steamboats on the St. Francis River. Cotton was shipped from the surrounding areas and stored in warehouses at Wittsburg for shipment and sale downstream in the big cotton cities like Memphis, Tennessee or New Orleans, Louisiana.

When Cross County was created in 1862 during the Civil War, Wittsburg was a thriving commercial and community hub in the region. Wittsburg was designated as the first county seat, but county business was actually conducted in Pineville due to threats from Union forces in the area.

== Notable person ==
- Thomas H. McCray, Confederate Army officer lived here after the war

== See also ==
- National Register of Historic Places listings in Cross County, Arkansas
- Wittsburg Fortification
