= 2023 Wynne–Parkin tornado =

2023 tornado in Northeast Arkansas

- The tornado southwest of Wynne as it started to form

Meteorological history
- Formed: March 31, 2023, 4:30 pm. CDT (UTC−05:00)
- Dissipated: March 31, 2023, 5:54 pm. CDT (UTC−05:00)
- Duration: 1 hour, 24 minutes

EF3 tornado
- on the Enhanced Fujita scale
- Highest winds: 150 mph (240 km/h)

Overall effects
- Fatalities: 4
- Injuries: 26
- Damage: $150.55 million (2023 USD)
- Areas affected: Wynne, Parkin, Earle, Turrell Arkansas/Drummonds, Tennessee
- Part of the Tornado outbreak of March 31 – April 1, 2023 and tornadoes of 2023

During the afternoon hours of March 31, 2023, a large and destructive rain-wrapped wedge tornado struck the city of Wynne, and caused additional damage in or around the communities of Parkin, Earle, Turrell, and Drummonds in Arkansas and Tennessee. The tornado caused considerable damage to Wynne and significant to severe damage to areas around northeastern Arkansas and western Tennessee, killing four people, injuring 26 others, and causing $150.5 million in damage. The tornado was on the ground for 1 hour, 24 minutes and had a total path length of 73 miles (117 km), with a total path width of 1,600 yards (1,500 m). This tornado was a part of the historic tornado outbreak of March 31 – April 1, 2023, and it was the costliest tornado of the outbreak. It was also the second-longest tracked tornado of the outbreak, behind the Bethel Springs EF3 tornado. The tornado was also the second-largest tornado of the outbreak.

== Meteorological synopsis ==
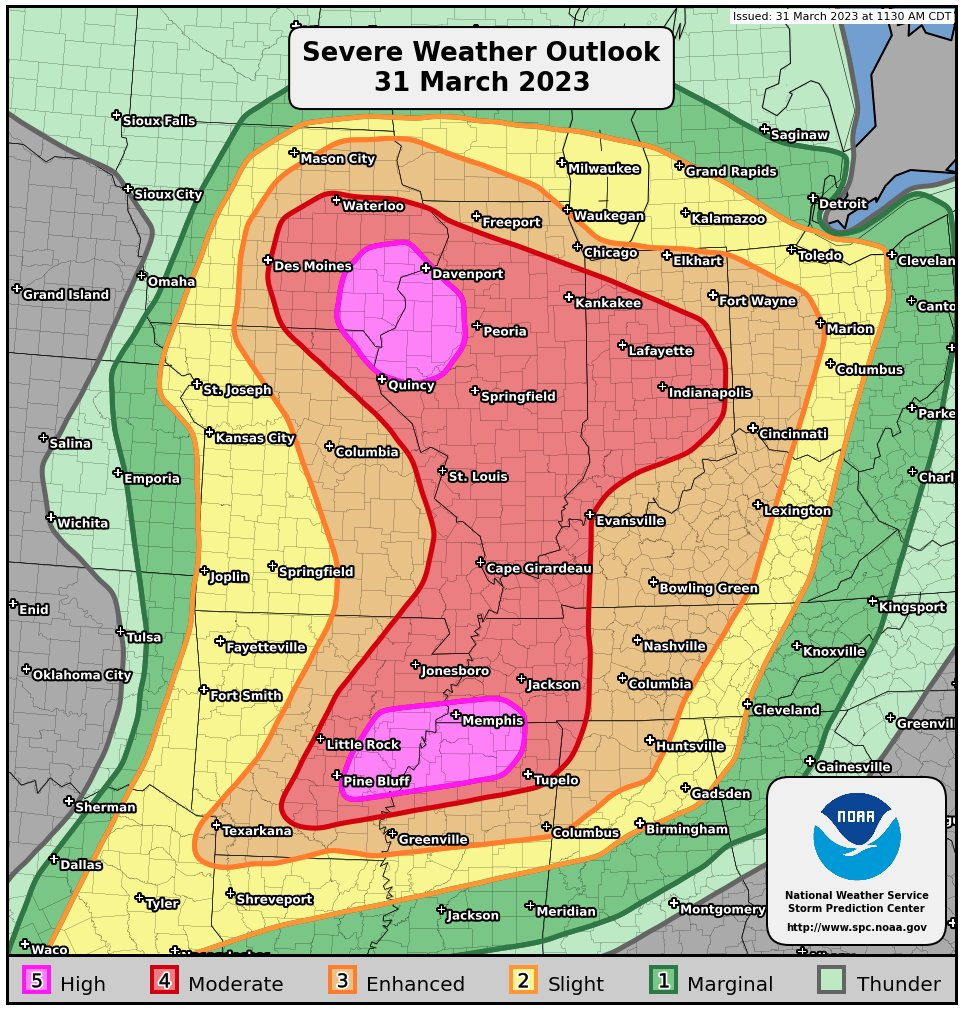
The Storm Prediction Center's Severe Weather Outlook for March 31, 2023

An extratropical cyclone developed over Nebraska on the morning of March 31. As a result, meteorologists expected a storm mode of discrete supercells to develop. This, along with even stronger CAPE values and a more unstable environment across Illinois and eastern Missouri, led to the SPC "bridging" the two main moderate-risk areas and giving a 15% hatched risk for significant tornadoes at their 1300 UTC outlook. The surrounding area, which extended into central portions of Kentucky and Tennessee, extreme southwestern Indiana, and northwestern Alabama, was given a 10% hatched risk for tornadoes. Additionally, a large 30% partially hatched contour for damaging wind gusts (with a smaller 45% risk in the northern part of the risk) and large hail were also added in this new outlook.

With increased confidence in favorable parameters for severe weather, the SPC upped the threat for strong tornadoes even further, introducing two tornado-driven high risk areas in their 16:30 UTC outlook; it was the first high-risk issuance since March 25, 2021. In 2024, SPC forecaster and meteorologist Andrew Lyons stated, "We've been building up to this crescendo all week, knowing that pretty much all the parameters are there for something big and then one by one, each piece kind of fell in that morning." The first high risk area covered southeastern Iowa, northwestern Illinois, and far northeastern Missouri, while the second included eastern Arkansas, southwestern Tennessee, and northern Mississippi. These two distinct areas were given a 30% hatched risk for tornadoes, given the extremely favorable environment for developing and sustaining discrete supercells with strong to violent tornado potential. The northern high-risk area was expected to see an arcing band of quasi-discrete supercells that would initially produce large hail before becoming tornadic, possibly producing several long-track strong to potentially violent tornadoes. Supercells would be more scattered but longer tracked within the southern high-risk area, with multiple rounds of tornadic storms capable of producing long-lived strong to violent tornadoes expected. The large area surrounding and connecting the two high-risk areas maintained a moderate risk, with an accompanying 15% hatched risk for tornadoes, as supercells that could develop in this environment could similarly sustain and rotate. However, storm coverage was expected to be somewhat lower, and the environment would not be as favorable. Throughout the main risk area, an elevated risk for damaging winds and large hail were also issued, with the supercells initially capable of producing huge hail and long-tracked tornadoes expected to transition into QLCS structures capable of producing very strong straight-line winds and additional tornadoes that evening. Soon after the upgrade into a high risk, the SPC introduced their first two particularly dangerous situation tornado watches, indicating a 90-95% chance for multiple tornadoes, and a 90% chance for multiple strong to violent tornadoes.

== Tornado track ==
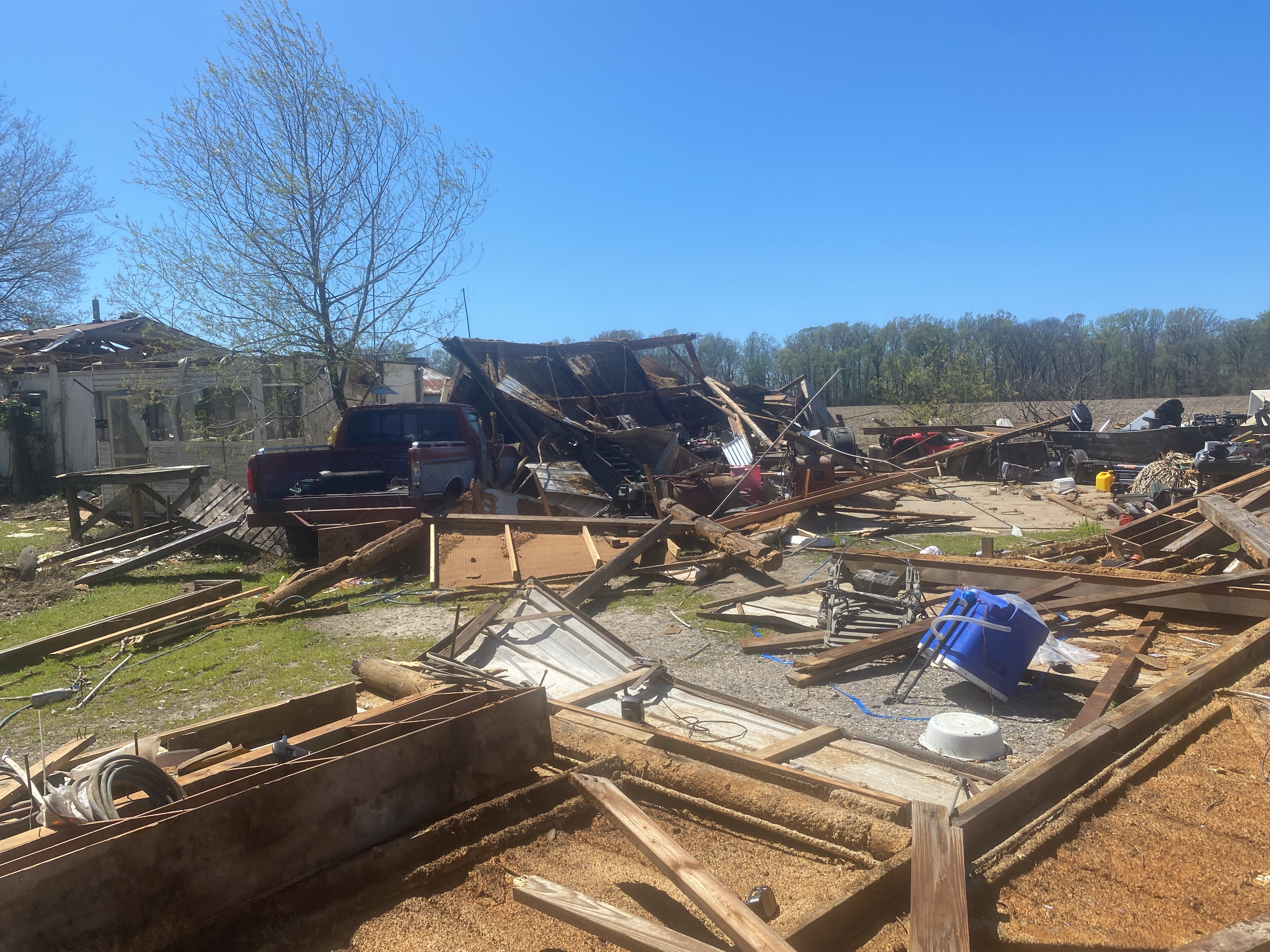
An outbuilding that was leveled at high-end EF1 intensity near the beginning of the damage path.

This long-tracked, intense wedge tornado touched down at 4:30 p.m. CDT west-southwest of Wynne, Arkansas, and moved east-northeastward along AR 284. It began as a relatively small and narrow tornado, but quickly grew and intensified shortly after it touched down, destroying an outbuilding and heavily damaging a home at high-end EF1 strength. The tornado reached EF2 intensity just beyond this point, as a home was unroofed and had multiple exterior walls knocked down, while a nearby trailer and vehicle were moved. Continuing east-northeast along AR 284, the tornado crossed AR 193 and caused additional EF2 damage in the rural community of Ellis Chapel, where wooden power poles were snapped, a metal outbuilding was completely destroyed, and a mobile home was rolled on its side and pushed against a tree. Another outbuilding was also destroyed, and a nearby home along County Road 640 had roof damage. After briefly weakening and causing high-end EF1 tree damage, the tornado reached EF2 intensity again as it crossed AR 284 in the McElroy community, where a house had its roof completely ripped off, a couple of other homes sustained roof damage, and McElroy United Methodist Church had a large section of its roof removed. The tornado continued to cause EF2 damage as it hit the Wynne Sewage Treatment Plant on County Road 619, where a large 80 yard (73 m)-long shed with a sturdy metal beam roof structure was completely flattened. The roof structure was torn off and thrown 100 yards (91 m) away, impacting and destroying two cinder-block buildings at the facility.

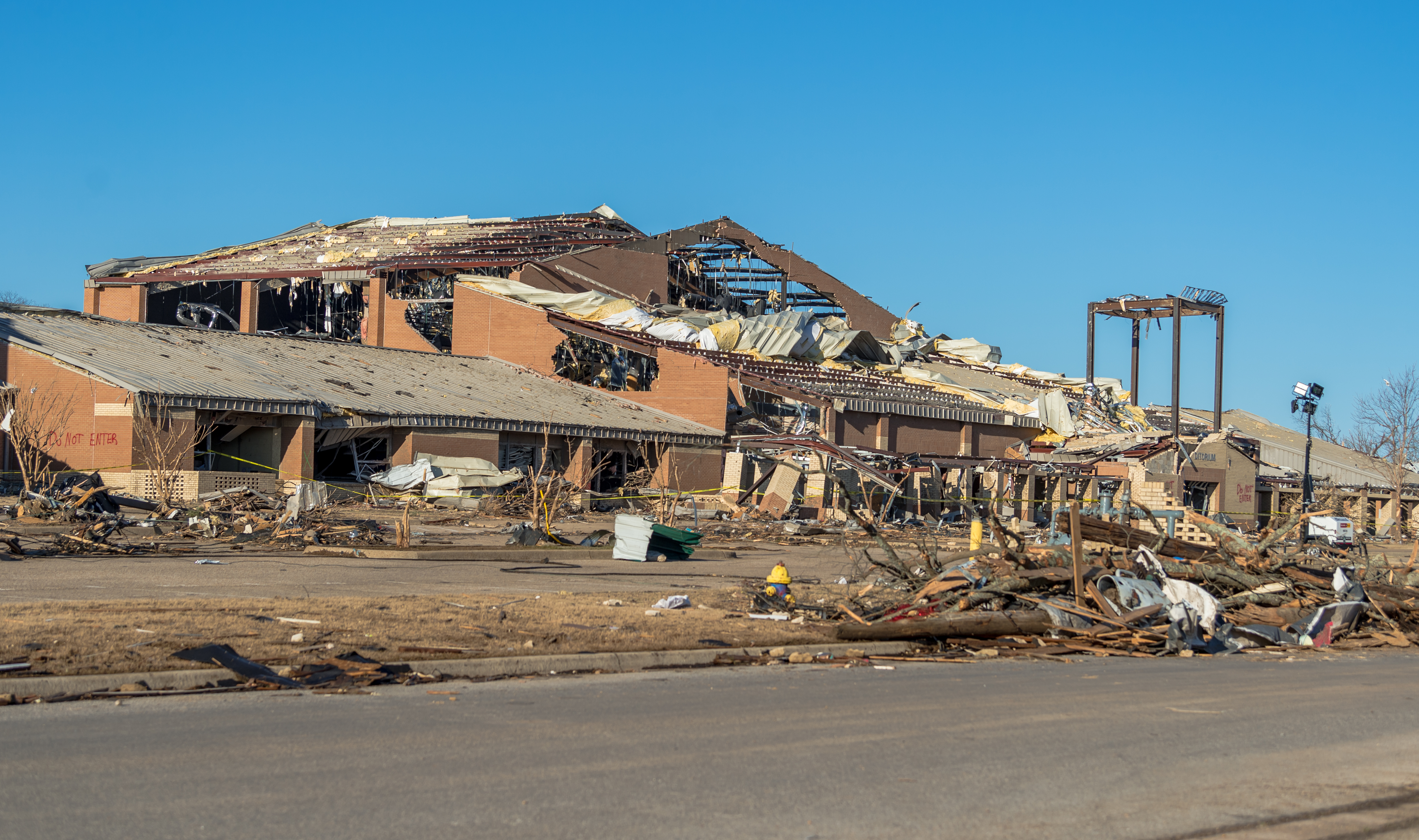
Major EF3 damage done to Wynne High School.

Widening and becoming increasingly rain-wrapped, the tornado then snapped and uprooted trees before it reached EF3 strength and moved directly through Wynne, cutting a swath of major damage through the center of the town. The Star 2 convenience store and several poorly anchored homes were leveled, one home was mostly swept from its foundation, and another home collapsed after a large tree fell on it, killing two people inside. Multiple mobile homes were obliterated, while many frame homes, apartment buildings, and some businesses were also heavily damaged with roofs torn off and exterior walls knocked down. Wynne High School also sustained major structural damage, with its roof and walls collapsed in multiple areas. The athletic fields at the school also incurred extensive damage, and large amounts of turf was ripped from the football field. A metal building on the property was crumpled, and free-standing light poles were toppled over. Wynne United Methodist Church was badly damaged, a large portion of the First Baptist Church was blown off its foundation and destroyed, and Grace Episcopal Church was leveled. A vacant school building also had severe damage, several rail cars on one of the Union Pacific rail lines on the western side of town were derailed, and many trees and power poles were snapped. The tornado reached its peak intensity along East Bridges Avenue and Peterson Road on the east side of Wynne, where multiple well-built homes were destroyed and left with only a few walls standing. The tornado exited town and passed near the now closed Wynne Municipal Airport and along US 64, causing EF2 to EF3 damage to a few residences, including an unanchored home that was completely leveled along County Road 7011. Multiple storm chasers and residents videoed the tornado, which was described as a "dark, ominous wedge", as it moved through Wynne, where a total of four fatalities occurred. The National Weather Service in Memphis, Tennessee, issued a tornado emergency for Parkin and Earle as the tornado exited the town. The tornado weakened as it followed US 64 to the east-northeast, producing EF1 damage as many trees were downed and an outbuilding was destroyed.

The tornado strengthened back to EF2 intensity as it passed to the north of Parkin and Earle, snapping many power poles and large hardwood trees, and overturning a pivot irrigation sprinkler. Past this area, the tornado weakened again as it moved through unpopulated farmland at EF1 strength, flipping 20 to 30 pivot irrigation sprinklers, inflicting minor damage to a house, and causing additional tree and power pole damage. Near Turrell, the tornado became strong again, and hundreds of hardwood trees were snapped or uprooted at EF2 intensity in forested areas south of town. Farther to the northeast, the tornado continued to strengthen as it passed through additional wooded areas near Corona Lake. EF3 tree damage occurred in this area as a large swath of hardwood trees was completely mowed down, and some debarking occurred. The tornado continued to straddle the Arkansas-Tennessee state line, with many trees being shredded near the Mississippi River. Around this time, another tornado emergency was issued for Dixonville, Quito, and Drummonds, Tennessee, and Gilt Edge was also added in an updated warning bulletin as well. After crossing the Mississippi River, the tornado weakened some but remained strong, snapping many large hardwood trees and causing EF2 damage as it struck Wilder Farms west of Drummonds. The tornado then moved past Drummonds and began to weaken further as a new circulation, which would produce the Covington EF3 tornado, strengthened to its south. Along the final portion of the path, the tornado inflicted EF0 to EF1 damage to many trees, several power poles, and a few homes and outbuildings. It dissipated south of Burlison at 5:54 p.m. CDT. The tornado had a total path length of 73 miles (117 km) and reached a peak width of 1,600 yards (1,500 m). Along with the four fatalities, 26 people were injured.

== Aftermath ==
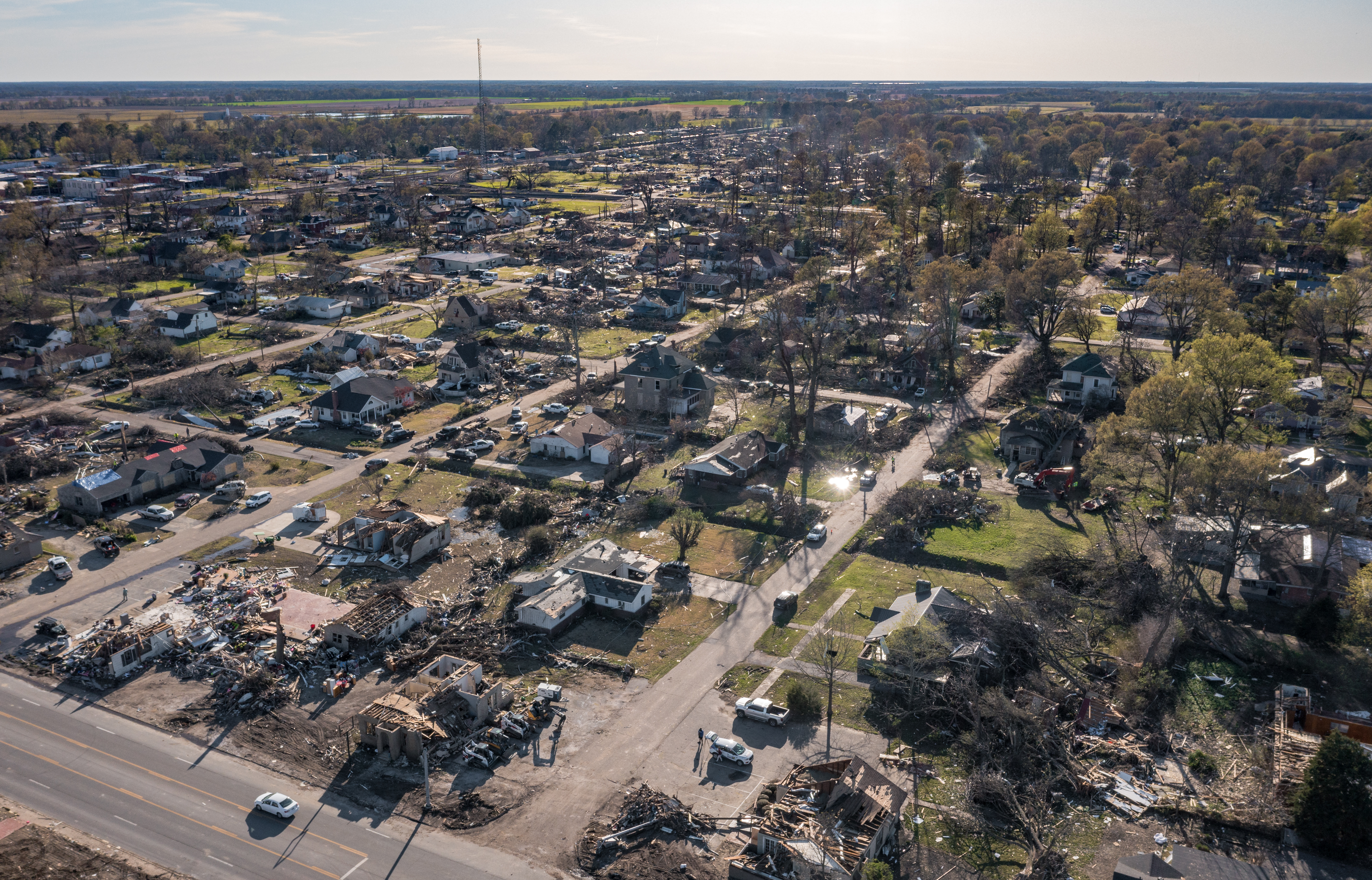
Aerial imagery of the damage path through Wynne after the tornado.

Sarah Huckabee Sanders, Governor of Arkansas, ordered the deployment of 100 Arkansas National Guard troops and released $250,000 in emergency funds for relief efforts. Sanders also declared a state of emergency. Sanders went to Wynne on April 3 to tour the damage left by the tornado. On April 12, Federal Emergency Management Agency and State of Arkansas opened a joint Disaster Recovery Center in Wynne, Arkansas to help survivors who were affected by the tornado. Local non-profit organizations and other agencies opened up one-stop shops for survivors. The Salvation Army provided over 25,222 meals, 9,903 drinks, and 16,383 snacks for victims affected by the tornado, as well as providing emotional and spiritual support for 991 people. The Memphis Area Command sent a team to Wynne to cook 150 meals at the Wynne Central Fire Department.

== See also ==
- List of United States tornado emergencies
- Weather of 2023
