= List of killings by law enforcement officers in the United States, July 2012 =

This is a list of people reported killed by non-military law enforcement officers in the United States in July 2012, whether in the line of duty or not, and regardless of reason or method. The listing documents the occurrence of a death, making no implications regarding wrongdoing or justification on the part of the person killed or officer involved. Killings are arranged by date of the incident that caused death. Different death dates, if known, are noted in the description. The table below lists 93 people.

== July 2012 ==
Date	Name (Age) of Deceased	State (City)	Description
2012-07-31	Arias, Rudy L. (27)	California (Hemet)	Arias was shot to death by officers after leading them on a foot chase and allegedly pointing a handgun at them. He was suspected of carjacking.
2012-07-31	Delgado, Gerardo (56)	Florida (Miami)	Miami-Dade detectives and FBI agents were investigating a home at night when a man allegedly jumped out of a car and began firing at them. Officers returned fire, and Detective John Saavedera was injured and Delgado was killed. Gerardo had begun shooting when the officers approached Luis Lazaro Estevanell, who was taken into custody and charged with Delgado's murder, according to a family member.
2012-07-31	Blankenship, Johnathan (40)	Maryland (Baltimore)	An officer was responding to a domestic disturbance when a struggle ensued with a man inside the home. When a second officer arrived and spotted a "knife-like object in the vicinity of the man," that officer shot Blankenship to death.
2012-07-31	Ryberg, Kevin	Colorado (Denver)	Officers had arrested a man for weapons and drug charges and were transporting him handcuffed inside a vehicle. The man allegedly was able to remove the cuffs and began to attack the officer driving the car. An officer driving behind them stopped to help, and Ryberg was shot to death.
2012-07-31	Taylor, Trevor (21)	California (Colton)	Officers were attempting to pull over a stolen vehicle and a pursuit ensued. They used a PIT maneuver to disable to vehicle. Taylor allegedly rammed into police cars in attempt to flee, and officers shot and killed him.
2012-07-31	Lara, Hector	Arizona (Phoenix)	Officers from a "multi-agency task force" were executing a search warrant when a suspect allegedly opened fire. Officers fired back and the man was shot to death.
2012-07-31	Chabot, Denis John	Texas (Houston)	Officers responded to report of man acting strangely at a motel. Chabot allegedly displayed aggression toward hotel security, and police say that officers found him running on a highway when they arrived. Officers fired a taser at Chabot when he continued running. Chabot had to be taken to a hospital, where he died.
2012-07-30	Naveja, Jose	California (Santa Maria)	A woman called 911 saying that a man had threatened her with a gun. Police reportedly identified the man at a gas station, and the man told them he was armed. After a low-speed chase, the man stopped, threw guns from his car, and officers tried to speak with him. Eventually the man got out of his car and allegedly picked up a gun, and officers shot the man to death.
2012-07-30	Holder, Ray (36)	Kentucky (Paris)	Police were called to a home regarding a domestic dispute. Holder allegedly answered the door with a weapon and began fighting the officer, Kevin Anderson, who shot him to death.
2012-07-30	Hughes, Gregory Martinez (22)	Mississippi (Tupelo)	Officers were responding to a report of shots fired at an apartment complex and an officer shot and killed Hughes.
2012-07-29	Conner, Charles Ronald (58)	Texas (Early)	Sergeant Steven Means and another man shot at Conner, killing him, when he allegedly opened fire at officers. Conner had just gunned down two people and two dogs after an argument.
2012-07-28	Garcia, Edgar (25)	California (Santa Paula)	Garcia was shot to death by officers after he allegedly shot and wounded an officer. Police say they had been called to the home twice that day over safety concerns.
2012-07-28	Girardot, Kenneth (38)	Arizona (Glendale)	Officer Justin Penrose spotted a stolen vehicle occupied by two men in a fast food parking lot and called for backup. As backup arrived, the driver began to try and drive out of the parking lot. When the car came toward him, Penrose shot and killed the driver, Girardot.
2012-07-28	Simms, Billy Wayne (28)	Oregon (Portland)	Police were responding to a report of a shooting when Officer Justin Clary shot and killed Simms, whose car then crashed into an exterior wall of an apartment.
2012-07-28	Davis, Joseph (29)	California (Turlock)	Officers recognized a parked car from a pursuit a few weeks earlier, and when Davis came outside and saw police, he fled and allegedly flashed a handgun at them. He was able to get to his car and a five-mile chase ensued, ending when Davis tried to carjack another vehicle. Three officers fired at Davis, killing him, after he fired into the vehicle he was trying to jack.
2012-07-27	Lockhart, James, III	Indiana (Lawrence)	An officer was pursuing a car that refused to stop for a traffic stop when the driver, Lockhart, reportedly shot at the officer through his windshield, striking him. Lockhart fled and allegedly shot at other officers who pursued him and eventually shot him to death.
2012-07-27	Aragon, Alfred (35)	Texas (San Antonio)	An undercover officer was giving a female friend a ride to her home from a nightclub because she was in fear of her ex-boyfriend, Aragon. When they arrived at her apartment, Aragon was waiting and allegedly began shooting at their car, striking her twice. The officer and the woman then drove to Aragon's house, where more shooting occurred. The incident ended with Aragon handcuffed, face down in his front yard, shot to death.
2012-07-26	Grant, Dawayne Lavar, Sr. (35)	Ohio (Akron)	Officers were pursuing Grant in a low-speed chase when he exited the vehicle and fled on foot. Police say he pulled out a gun and refused to drop it, and officers shot and killed him.
2012-07-25	Larrance, Julius Richard (19)	Florida (Clearwater)	Larrance was shot to death by officers after running from them when they tried to talk to him. He was armed and reportedly shot at the officers during the pursuit, with officers returning fire. He then barricaded himself in an apartment, and was found dead when police entered.
2012-07-25	Burbank, Eric	California (Corona)	Officers were responding to a report of a man threatening neighbors at an apartment complex and began to chase Burbank, who matched the caller's description. Police say they saw Burbank pull a handgun from his waistband, and they shot him to death.
2012-07-25	Heeter, Richard	Missouri (St. Louis)	Police were responding to a report of shots fired at a home when Heeter allegedly shot two of the responding officers and then fled. A SWAT team was called and Heeter was found, but refused commands to lay down on the ground and allegedly stabbed a SWAT officer. Other officers opened fire, killing him.
2012-07-24	Harper, James	Texas (Dallas)	Harper was shot to death by Officer Brian Rowden following a foot chase and struggle. Harper was not armed. Officers originally began pursuing him when he ran from a house that police had entered while responding to what they suspect was a bogus 911 call by drug rivals.
2012-07-23	Badgett, Lonnie (51)	North Carolina (Dobson)	Badgett was shot to death by Officer Brian Thomas after shooting the officer twice in the leg. Badgett's wife had called 911 after her husband hit her in the head with the butt of a rifle. Badgett was armed with a handgun and a semi-automatic rifle.
2012-07-23	Patterson, Henry (55)	Florida (Westchester)	Police knocked on Patterson's door to arrest him for aggravated stalking at about 9 p.m. Police shot and killed the Patterson, who was armed, according to neighbors.
2012-07-23	McRaven, Charles Scooter (31)	Tennessee (Drummonds)	Officers were responding to a domestic violence call when McRaven answered the door holding a shotgun. They commanded him to drop the gun, and when he refused, Deputy Ryan Magee shot the man to death.
2012-07-23	Soto, Andy Puente	Nevada (Henderson)	Police were attempting to pull over Soto to execute an arrest warrant, but Soto refused to stop. Eventually his vehicle was disabled, and he attempted to carjack a vehicle but was unsuccessful. Officers shot him to death when they believed he was making "furtive movements" and could have a gun. Soto was unarmed.
2012-07-23	Mehlberger, Edward (39)	Pennsylvania (Philadelphia)	An off-duty officer shot and killed Mehlberger when the man allegedly broke into the officer's home.
2012-07-22	Mesino, Abraham (40)	Texas (Mount Pleasant)	Officers responding to a report of domestic violence arrived to find Mesino intoxicated and threatening his family. Mesino allegedly pointed a gun at a deputy, who shot and killed him.
2012-07-22	Acevedo, Joel	California (Anaheim)	Officers were pursuing a stolen car when three suspects ran from the vehicle. They shot Acevedo to death after he allegedly fired at them while they chased him on foot. This incident marked the second police killing in Anaheim in under 48 hours, continuing the protesting and unrest sparked by the first killing.
2012-07-22	Marias-Quevedo, Marcial (41)	Illinois (Franklin Park)	An off-duty officer was driving a personal vehicle when he struck and killed a pedestrian. The officer was charged with aggravated DUI.
2012-07-22	Mays, Tracy (29)	Illinois (Westchester)	An off-duty police officer attended a graduation party with Mays. The two began to argue, then he shot Mays. The officer then shot himself and was hospitalized.
2012-07-22	Neal, Jevon (16)	Florida (Tampa)	Neal was shot to death by officers at a party after allegedly pointing an assault-style shotgun at them. Police had arrived on the scene about an hour earlier in response to a report of someone shooting a weapon. They had identified Neal and approached the teen, who reportedly ran upstairs and pulled out a gun.
2012-07-22	Payne, Brandon	Massachusetts (Lynn)	Payne was shot and killed after the vehicle he was driving allegedly rammed into a police cruiser. Officers were attempting to pull over two vehicles, suspecting them of engaging in an exchange of firearms. Three officers and a state trooper shot at him.
2012-07-22	Walsh, Danny L. (58)	Missouri (Kansas City)	Walsh was shot to death by officers after aiming a rifle at them. Police were responding to a report of shots fired.
2012-07-22	Thomas, Alesia	California (Los Angeles)	Police pursued Thomas on foot after she abandoned her children at the police station claiming she could not care for them due to her drug addictions. Police pursued her to arrest her for endangering her children but Thomas resisted arrest. During the arrest Thomas was thrown to the ground and kicked in the genitals. She stopped breathing in the back of the squad car. At time of publication it was unclear if her death was the result of the violent arrest, a drug overdose, a medical condition or a combination of those factors.
2012-07-21	Diaz, Manuel (25)	California (Anaheim)	Officers saw Diaz talking to two men in a vehicle and, thinking the activity suspicious, approached the car. The car drove off and the officers pursued Diaz on foot, eventually shooting him. Diaz was unarmed. This incident sparked several days of unrest and conflict between police and protesters in the city.
2012-07-21	Culp, Jacqueline (59)	Georgia (Atlanta)	An officer responding to a call with lights and siren on struck another vehicle at high speed in an intersection. Culp died from injuries sustained in the accident. The officer was charged with second degree vehicular homicide.
2012-07-21	Torres, Jose (18)	Pennsylvania (Philadelphia)	Officers were dispersing a crowd gathered around a bar when Torres fled, dropping a pistol on the ground. Officers pursued Torres, and one officer shot and killed him when he believed the young man was reaching into his waistband for another weapon. A second gun was not recovered.
2012-07-20	Keith, Craig	West Virginia (Ripley)	Police responded to a call from security officers at a casino regarding a disturbance. Keith, who had been drinking, fled in an SUV, with numerous officers pursuing him across three counties. After officers used stop-sticks to force him to stop, Keith exited the vehicle and officers opened fire, killing him. Police say he did not obey commands. He was unarmed.
2012-07-19	Ventura, David Miguel	California (Corona)	Officers were responding to a report of domestic abuse and a shooting arrived to see a man driving away from the area at high speed. The pursued the man, who eventually jumped out of the moving vehicle holding a handgun, police said. They shot and killed Ventura, who was 34.
2012-07-18	Mojica, Joanna Ann (26)	Florida (Bradenton)	Mojica, a mother of two was shot in the head by Officer Aaron Bradley after driving a car toward officers in attempt to escape. Police had surprised Mojica and 26-year-old Jesse Flores while they were committing a burglary.
2012-07-18	Pralourng, Pralith (32)	California (San Francisco)	Pralourng was shot to death by officers after refusing to drop a box cutter. He had fled from his workplace after reportedly slashing a coworker in the arm. Pralourng was a diagnosed schizophrenic.
2012-07-17	Thomas, Destin (21)	Ohio (Columbus)	Thomas had called to police to report a burglary at his apartment, and was shot to death by Officer William Kaufman when he exited the building with a gun in his hand.
2012-07-16	Sanchez, Manuel	Oklahoma (Tulsa)	Shot to death after allegedly pointing a unloaded gun at an officer who pursued him as a suspect in two attempted robberies near by. He was shot twice, no witnesses no body cam footage was captured to verify officers claim
2012-07-15	Hall, George M.	Ohio (Columbus)	A man flagged down officers to point out a man with a gun. When they approached the armed man, police say he pulled out a gun and pointed at them. They shot him multiple times, killing him.
2012-07-15	Williams, Timmie (36)	Florida (Miami)	Williams was shot to death by an officer after stabbing someone. The victim's mother, a witness, claimed the officer did not identify himself or speak to her son before he began shooting.
2012-07-15	Scott, Andrew Lee (26)	Florida (Leesburg)	Police were looking for an attempted murder suspect when they knocked on the wrong door. Scott, who was not expecting visitors, answered the door holding a gun, which was reportedly pointed at the officers. Without identifying themselves, police immediately shot and killed Scott. Media reports say police consider the man "at least partially responsible."
2012-07-15	Sok, Vanna (24)	Pennsylvania (Philadelphia)	An SUV pulled up to a street corner and, after a short confrontation, began shooting. Sok, who had a registered gun, fired back at the vehicle. A nearby officer then shot Sok, who had his back turned, without warning from inside a police car, according to several witnesses. Police say the officers stepped out of the car and Sok turned around and pointed the gun at them before they shot him in the head.
2012-07-14	Alexander, Derick D.	Ohio (Columbus)	Officers were responding to a domestic situation and were attempting to arrest Alexander when he stabbed an officer twice. That officer shot Alexander multiple times, killing him.
2012-07-14	Bowman, Devonte	Maryland (Baltimore)	Shot and killed after refusing to cooperate and allegedly reaching for a weapon. Officers were responding to a call about an armed man.
2012-07-14	Vanderbeek, Jacob	Colorado (Villa Grove)	Officer attempted to stop suspect for a traffic violation. During an 80-mile chase suspect dropped out of his vehicle a hand grenade that was later determined to be inert. Upon stopping the suspect produced what appeared to be a weapon. Suspect was shot once by an officer.
2012-07-14	Taylor, Devin (24)	South Carolina (Sumter)	An officer stopped Taylor for speeding. The officer attempted to arrest Taylor for driving while intoxicated but Taylor resisted. After use of a Taser was ineffective, the officer fatally shot Taylor.
2012-07-13	Henderson, Matthew (28)	Pennsylvania (Philadelphia)	Henderson was shot to death by officers after getting out of his car with a gun and pointing it at a police sergeant.
2012-07-13	North, DeWayne	Georgia (Atlanta)	Shot to death by officers responding to a call about four men burglarizing a home. The men allegedly threatened several women at gunpoint and stole money. Police confronted them outside the home, shooting two and killing one.
2012-07-12	Brown, James (26)	Texas, (El Paso)	Brown checked into the El Paso County Jail for a two-day DWI sentence and suffered an in cell "episode" with officers responding in riot gear but belatedly released video you can hear Brown yelling that he can't breathe.
2012-07-12	Cox, Ronald Jr. (48)	Maryland (Reisterstown)	Cox was shot and killed after swinging a sword at officers who confronted him in a bedroom of a home. Police were executing a warrant to arrest Cox's niece.
2012-07-12	Devilla, Victor (43)	Massachusetts (Worcester)	A state trooper attempted to pull over a vehicle that had been reported stolen when the driver allegedly drove at the trooper, who shot Devilla (also reported as Davila) to death. A female passenger fled on foot.
2012-07-12	Escribano, Frank (78)	Connecticut (Torrington)	An officer responded to a report of an armed man on the highway. Escribano "charged at the trooper armed with a knife." The officer initially retreated, but eventually felt the needed to shoot him. Escribano was pronounced dead at a local hospital.
2012-07-12	Mendez, David (68)	California (Modesto)	Detective Steve Anderson and Officer Ron Lemings went to Mendez's house to arrest him for a felony sex crime. When they arrived at the door, Mendez said he had a written confession to give them, and pulled a knife from a desk drawer and began stabbing himself. They ordered him to drop the knife, and after Lemings attempted to subdue him with a Taser, Detective Anderson shot Mendez, who died in a hospital two weeks later.
2012-07-11	Williams, Tremayne Marshawn (27)	California (San Bernardino)	Williams was shot and killed, and a woman accompanying him shot and wounded, during a police chase through two cities after officers attempted to pull over a stolen vehicle.
2012-07-11	Morales, Ernesto	Connecticut (Hartford)	Four officers approached three men inside a parked car at an apartment complex around 1 a.m. because of suspicious activity. They ordered the men to show their hands, and Morales (the driver) rammed his car into the police cruiser and then allegedly drove at the officers who were on foot. One officer then shot at the vehicle, which crashed into the apartment building. Morales was killed and the other two men were injured.
2012-07-10	Day, Karen (44)	Kansas (Wichita)	Day's husband Derrick Jackson called police when she showed up at his home despite filing a protection from abuse order against him. He was calling to clarify terms of the order. When officers arrived they were approached by Day who was armed with a knife. Day refused to drop the knife, and allegedly told officers, "Shoot me!" Officers shot her multiple times to death.
2012-07-10	Jones, Brandon (23)	Missouri (St. Louis)	Officers were responding to a home burglary by three individuals when two of them began shooting at police. In their return fire officers shot Jones to death, while the other two suspects fled and were captured. A SWAT team was also present.
2012-07-09	Lara, Rufino	Texas (Houston)	Two officers were responding to a call about assault outside an abandoned store and began to question a group of men there. Florida Rubio, a witness, said she made the call at Lara's request because he feared the other men were going to hurt him. Lara attempted to leave the scene, refusing an officer's commands to turn around or show his hands. The officer claims she gave commands both in English and Spanish (Lara did not speak English). Rubio said she attempted to tell the officers that Lara needed help, but that she was ignored. When Lara did turn around, one hand was in his pocket, and the officer shot him to death. Lara was unarmed.
2012-07-09	Lagueux, Jason (35)	New Hampshire (Litchfield)	Police responded to neighbors' reports of gunshots to find a man on his front porch with a gun. Local and county police as well as state troopers arrived on the scene. Officers report a confrontation occurred. Neighbors report a "loud volley of gunfire." An autopsy determined that Lagueux died of a single gunshot wound to the back.
2012-07-08	Miller, Adaisha	Michigan (Detroit)	Miller was at her own birthday party when she hugged an off-duty police officer from behind. His service weapon fired, puncturing Miller's lung and hitting her heart.
2012-07-08	Kaelber, Nicholas Allen (21)	Virginia (Mount Vernon)	Late in the evening officers said they saw two men acting suspiciously; when they approached, one man fled. The officers pursued him and a struggle ensued, including shots fired at officers by Kaelber, according to police. One officer then shot Kaelber, who was pronounced dead at a hospital.
2012-07-08	Aho, Robert Elias (46)	Minnesota (North Branch)	Aho was shot to death by officers after they were called to a home concerning a domestic disturbance. Upon arrival, officers said they learned a man inside had a gun and had fired one shot while they were on their way. Officers said the man then confronted them with the gun, and a deputy shot the man, who died later in the hospital.
2012-07-08	Sampson, Marquise (19)	Illinois (Chicago)	Sampson was shot multiple times in the back by officers as they pursued him. Officers had become suspicious when they saw him running. He had just robbed a restaurant. Police say Sampson had pointed a gun at an officer.
2012-07-08	Beltran, Justin (26)	Texas (Denton)	Officers were called to a home around 2:30 am by someone who heard a gunshot. They identified a vehicle described by the caller and followed it out of the area. According to officers, they were attempting to pull over the vehicle when the driver stepped out with a rifle. Officers say the man refused to drop his weapon, and they shot him to death.
2012-07-08	Fitzgerald, Jamie Renée (35)	California (El Cajon)	Police shot and killed Fitzgerald after she pointed a shotgun at them. She had called 911 saying she wanted to turn over the gun. Her sister told reporters she had recently been released from the hospital because of emotional problems. Fitzgerald died in a hospital nearly one week after the shooting.
2012-07-07	Knight, Stephen Lawrence, Jr. (31)	West Virginia (Charleston)	State trooper J.R. Coburn shot and killed Knight, who had been handcuffed in the back of a police car but somehow made his way into the driver's seat. Knight reportedly fled in the vehicle and then on foot, and in an ensuing struggle with officers allegedly gained control of an officer's weapon. State Trooper Coburn then shot Knight to death in his second killing in six months.
2012-07-07	Havard, Bryan Reyes	Montana (Plentywood	Police were led on a high-speed chase by Havard, an oil field worker, after trying to pull him over for a traffic violation. Havard then fled on foot into a casino, allegedly with a pistol, where he was shot to death by officers.
2012-07-07	Anderson, Jeffery	Oregon (Aloha)	Police were responding to a 911 call of an armed man walking down the street and "were forced to open fire" on him. A grandfather of five and husband of 35 years, Anderson had been struggling with depression.
2012-07-07	Herrera, Asencion (17)	California (Sacramento)	Herrera was walking his blind friend, Arturo Istlas (also 17), through the neighborhood at 6 pm (daylight) when they were approached by officers who thought they looked suspicious. When the officers approached the boys, they claim they noticed a large assault rifle sticking out of Herrera's shirt, and immediately began shooting without any warning, according to Istlas. Officers allege the teenager reached for the gun. Family members say they do not know where the gun came from but that it was not loaded. Herrera died on the scene. Istlas was not hurt and says he did not know his friend was armed.
2012-07-07	Santillan, Juan Pablo Perez (30)	Mexico (Matamoros)	Santillan was assisting people in illegally crossing the Rio Grande. Some on the Mexican side threw rocks towards agents on the US side. One agent fired across the river when someone was seen aiming a rifle. Santillan was killed by a gunshot on the river bank in Matamoros. Santillan was unarmed.
2012-07-06	Capps, Paul Edward (47)	Tennessee (Knoxville)	Police were called to the home where Capps lived with his mother, where Capps had allegedly been assaulting and threatening to kill her. When Officer Brian Leatherwood entered the home, Capps began attacking him and hitting the officer with his own flashlight. Officer Leatherwood then shot and killed Capps, who was a diagnosed schizophrenic. His family members said that they had never known him to be violent before this incident.
2012-07-06	Kirkland, James	Florida (Pensacola)	Officers were responding to an armed disturbance call when they shot and killed Kirkland, who was reportedly attempting suicide prior to their arrival. Officers said Kirkland lowered his gun at them.
2012-07-05	Munive, Cesar (22)	Illinois (Cicero)	Officers arrived at the scene of a gang fight, prompting the gang members to scatter. Officers chased one suspect about a block, at which point he turned and pointed his weapon at the officers. The officers shot the suspect who died at a local hospital.
2012-07-05	Durham, Keith Jamarcus	South Carolina (Columbia)	Deputy Reginald Grant approached Durham in the parking lot of a Quality Inn when he believed he saw a domestic disturbance. Durham, who had a large amount of cocaine in his possession, ran from the officer, who chased him down and attempted to subdue him with a taser. A struggle ensued, and Grant shot Durham multiple times.
2012-07-04	Owens, Edgar (46)	New York (New York)	Owens was described by police as an emotionally disturbed person who attacked an officer without provocation. After being stabbed in the eye, the officer fired four times, killing Owens.
2012-07-04	Brewer, Kent (19)	Arizona (Show Low)	Brewer was shot to death in the chest by officers after he allegedly refused to drop the sword he was "wielding." Officers were responding to a call about a family fight in the apartment. Brewer was pronounced dead on the scene.
2012-07-04	Nazar, William	California (Turlock)	Police were responding to a report of an armed suicidal man when Nazar allegedly walked out of his home shooting at officers. Deputy Steve Gerhardt returned fire, killing him.
2012-07-04	Tobin, Marshall	California (Vallejo)	A 911 call about domestic violence led police to a Safeway where they identified Tobin from the caller's description. Officers said they could see Tobin's handgun, and after he refused to put his hands on top of his vehicle they tried to subdue him with a taser. Tobin then allegedly reached for his handgun, and the officers shot him to death.
2012-07-04	Alvarez, Vincent	Arizona (Tucson)	Police were called about a man assaulting someone with a baseball bat. When they arrived, officers said Alvarez approached them aggressively with "a large edged weapon" and they shot him to death.
2012-07-04	Naecker, Fritz O. (63)	Maryland (Sandy Spring)	Police responded to report of an armed man at a restaurant. The police arrived to find the man in the outdoor patio area of the restaurant "waving a silver handgun." Two officers fired at the man when he allegedly turned to enter the restaurant, killing him. Police were unsure if the gun was loaded.
2012-07-03	Alaya, Alex	California (Orange Cove)	Alaya's mother called the police when she became concerned that her son may be suicidal. According to his family, Alaya was schizophrenic and having hallucinations, and was armed with a knife when police shot him to death. Neighbors said they heard officers yelling for the man to get down, and they heard about 5-8 shots.
2012-07-02	Laney, Michael Deangelo	North Carolina (Charlotte)	Police spotted Laney riding a scooter that matched a description from an armed robbery a week prior and attempted to stop him, but Laney "took off," eventually abandoning the scooter and running to his home. Police caught up with Laney and a struggle ensued, whereupon the suspect allegedly pulled out a handgun. Officers then shot him to death.
2012-07-02	Berg, Matthew Lyell (47)	California (Buellton)	Berg was shot to death on Hwy 101 following a pursuit down Hwy 246 that began with a 911 call about a burglary. After officers attempted to cut him off, Berg allegedly rammed into a deputy's car, and that deputy opened fire and killed Berg.
2012-07-01	Hall, Milton (49)	Michigan (Saginaw)	Police were called to a shopping center by gas station employees complaining of Hall's behavior inside the store. A thirty-minute confrontation between officers and Hall, who had a knife, ended with officers shooting him to death. A video was released and shows the officers involved armed with semi-automatic rifles and pistols, Officers fired as many as 46 rounds at Hall, who was reportedly homeless and mentally disabled.
2012-07-01	Castillo, Jesus	California (Moreno Valley)	Officers arrived at Moreno Valley Community Park after a report that a man had been harassing children near a restroom. Officers approached Castillo near a concession stand where a struggle ensued. Castillo allegedly attempted to choke the officer, who fired and shot Castillo to death. Hundreds of adults and children heard the gunfire.
2012-07-01	Smith, Harry (59)	Alaska (Anchorage)	Smith was shot to death by two officers after reportedly pointing an air gun at them. Police say he had threatened to kill family members and himself, and that the air gun was designed to look like a pistol.
2012-07-01	Wudtee, Michael	Maryland (Baltimore)	Officer Paul Heffernan shot and killed Wudtee after witnessing him repeatedly assault his girlfriend in a parking lot.

== See also ==
- Death in custody § United States
- Henry A. Wallace Police Crime Public Database
- List of cases of police brutality
- List of countries with annual rates and counts for killings by law enforcement officers
- List of law enforcement officers killed in the line of duty in the United States
- List of law enforcement officers convicted for an on-duty killing in the United States
- List of shootings by US immigration agents
- List of police reforms related to the George Floyd protests
- List of unarmed African Americans killed by law enforcement officers in the United States
- Lists of killings by law enforcement officers
- Police brutality in the United States
- Police misconduct § United States
- Police riot § United States
- Police use of deadly force in the United States
