= Wynne High School =

Wynne Senior High School
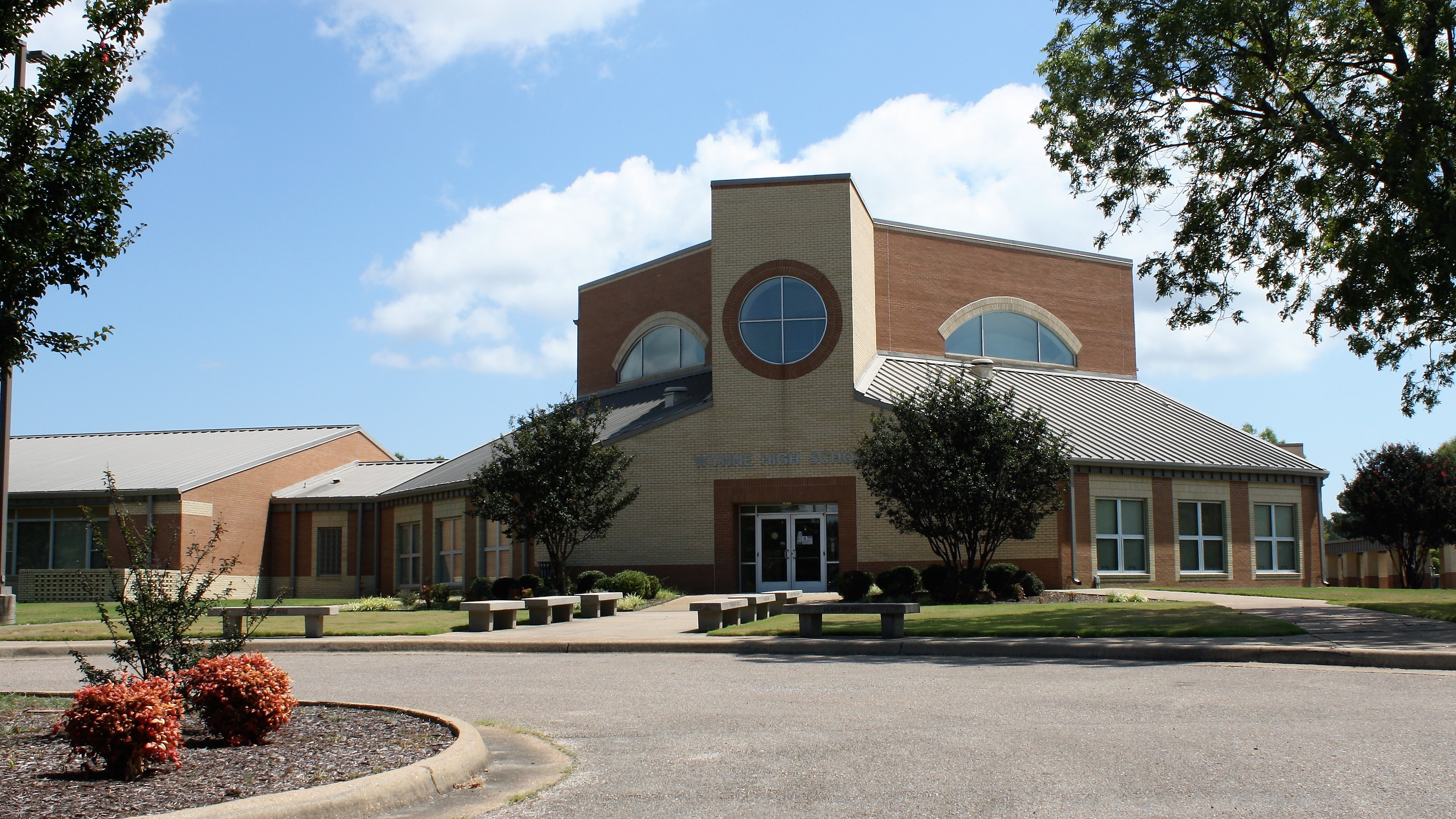

Location
- 1300 North Falls Boulevard; Wynne, Arkansas 72356; United States; 35°13′46″N 90°46′57″W

Information
- School type: Public
- Founded: 1902 (124 years ago)
- Status: Open
- School district: Wynne School District
- NCES District ID: 0514430
- CEEB code: 042720
- NCES School ID: 051443001176
- Principal: Dusty Meek
- Teaching staff: 86.50 (FTE)
- Enrollment: 744 (2023-2024)
- Student to teacher ratio: 8.60
- Education system: Smart Core curriculum
- Campus type: Rural
- Colors: Blue and gold
- Athletics conference: 5A East (2012–14)
- Mascot: Hammer and Honey
- Team name: Yellowjackets
- Accreditation: AdvancED; Arkansas Department of Education
- Affiliation: Arkansas Activities Association
- Website: www.wynneschools.org/o/sr-high-school

Wynne Senior High School, known as Wynne High School, is a public secondary school for students in grades nine through twelve located in Wynne, Arkansas, United States. It is one of two public high schools in Cross County and the sole high school administered by the Wynne School District. It was destroyed by a tornado on March 31, 2023.

In addition to Wynne it also serves Parkin, since the former Parkin School District merged into the Wynne district on September 7, 2005.

== Academics ==
Wynne High School is accredited by the Arkansas Department of Education (ADE) and has been accredited by AdvancED since 1927. The assumed course of study follows the Common Core curriculum developed by the ADE. Students complete regular (core and career focus) courses and exams and may select Advanced Placement (AP) coursework and exams that provide an opportunity for college credit.

== Athletics ==
The Wynne High School mascot and athletic emblem is the Yellowjacket with the school colors of blue and gold.

The Wynne Yellowjackets participate in numerous interscholastic sports and events in the 5A-East Conference administered by the Arkansas Activities Association including: baseball, basketball (boys/girls), cheer, cross country (boys/girls), dance, football, golf (boys/girls), soccer (boys), softball, tennis (boys/girls), track (boys/girls), and volleyball.

The Yellowjackets football team are four-time state football champions by winning titles in 1950, 1986, 2001 and 2004. In 2013, the school retired the No. 34 jersey of NFL running back and Wynne alumnus DeAngelo Williams who ran for 2,204 yards and 34 touchdowns in 2001.

The Yellowjackets softball team are two-time state champions, picking up titles in 2009 and 2011. They were the state runner-up in 2010.

== Notable alumni ==
- Hugh Taylor (American football), former Yellowjacket & wide receiver for the Washington Redskins
- DeAngelo Williams, running back for the Pittsburgh Steelers

== 2023 Wynne Tornado ==
On March 31, 2023, a tornado struck and heavily damaged the school and surrounding town.
