= Dave Hanner =

American football player and coach (1930–2008)

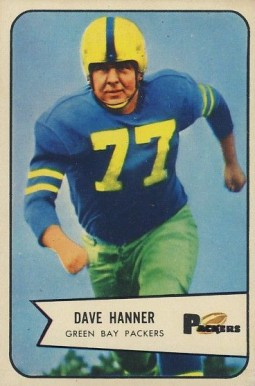
- Hanner on a 1954 Bowman football card

No. 77, 79
- Position: Defensive tackle

Personal information
- Born: May 20, 1930; Parkin, Arkansas, U.S.
- Died: September 11, 2008 (aged 78); Tarpon Springs, Florida, U.S.
- Listed height: 6 ft 2 in (1.88 m)
- Listed weight: 257 lb (117 kg)

Career information
- High school: Parkin
- College: Arkansas (1948–1951)
- NFL draft: 1952: 5th round, 52nd overall pick

Career history

Playing
- Green Bay Packers (1952–1964)

Coaching
- Green Bay Packers (1965–1971) Defensive line coach; Green Bay Packers (1972–1979) Defensive coordinator; Green Bay Packers (1982) Quality control assistant

Awards and highlights
- 2× NFL champion (1961, 1962); Second-team All-Pro (1954); 2× Pro Bowl (1953, 1954); Green Bay Packers Hall of Fame; 2× First-team All-SWC (1950, 1951)

Career NFL statistics
- Fumble recoveries: 9
- Interceptions: 4
- Sacks: 18
- Stats at Pro Football Reference
- Coaching profile at Pro Football Reference

Joel David "Hawg" Hanner (May 20, 1930 – September 11, 2008) was an American professional football player, coach, and scout.

Following a collegiate career with the Arkansas Razorbacks, in 1952 Hanner was drafted by the Green Bay Packers of the National Football League (NFL), for whom he started at defensive tackle. He was twice selected to the NFL Pro Bowl and was a member of two World Championship teams. He immediately moved into coaching with the Packers following his retirement as an active player, serving as defensive coordinator under two head coaches.

Hanner's streak of 28 consecutive years associated as a player or coach of the Packers is second in team history to that of legendary player-coach Curly Lambeau.

== Biography ==
=== Early life ===
Born and raised in Parkin, Arkansas, Hanner grew up with four siblings on a family farm west of Memphis and played college football at the University of Arkansas.

Hanner played tackle for the Arkansas varsity football for three seasons (freshmen were prohibited from varsity play during this era). He was honored as a member of the Associated Press' 1950 All-Southwest Conference team and unanimously picked to the All-Southwest Conference team in 1951.

His association with the Razorbacks provided the source of his nickname.

=== Playing career ===
Selected in the fifth round of the 1952 NFL draft, 52nd overall, Hanner played defensive tackle for the Packers for 13 seasons, from 1952 to 1964, and was selected for the Pro Bowl in 1953 and 1954.

He started at left defensive end in 1961 and 1962 for the team's first two National Football League championships under head coach Vince Lombardi.

During his NFL career, Hanner played in 160 of 164 possible regular season games, missing three of those in his rookie season.

=== Coaching career ===
Following his playing career, Hanner immediately stepped into coaching with the Packers, initially being named as defensive line coach by head coach Vince Lombardi. He would ultimately spend 16 seasons as an assistant coach with the team.

When Dan Devine took over as head coach in 1971, he was promoted to the defensive coordinator, a position he served in until 1974. Bart Starr became the team's head coach in 1975 and Hanner remained as the assistant head coach and defensive coordinator.

Hanner was fired by Starr following the disappointing 1979 season, during which the team finished with a record of 5–11. This marked an end to Hanner's 28 consecutive year stint with the team — the second longest run in team history to that of legendary player and coach Curly Lambeau.

"I just felt the decision had to be made because we weren't getting the total effort from our defense," head coach Starr told the media following the surprising termination. "I can't say that Dave is solely responsible or that this move is a total cure-all. I just felt a change in leadership was needed."

A nine-year teammate of Starr's, Hanner was regarded as the head coach's closest confidant on the staff and was taken aback by the firing. "I was surprised, but these things happen in this game," he said. "I'm more hurt than I am bitter."

Hanner subsequently took a position with the rival Chicago Bears), but returned as the Packers' quality control assistant in 1982. He transferred into a scout role until he retired in 1996.

Hanner was inducted into both the Green Bay Packers Hall of Fame and the Arkansas Sports Hall of Fame.

=== Death and legacy ===
After being in poor health for an extended period, Hanner suffered a heart attack and died two days later on September 11, 2008, at the age of 78. He was survived by his wife, six children, seven grandchildren, and two great-grandchildren.
