= Cortney Lance Bledsoe =

American writer, poet, and book reviewer

C.L. Bledsoe
- Born: Cortney Lance Bledsoe; 14 May 1976 (age 50); Wynne, Arkansas, US
- Occupations: Novelist, poet, reviewer

Cortney Lance Bledsoe (born May 14, 1976) is an American writer, poet, and book reviewer. He has published eight books and hundreds of short stories, poems, essays, short plays, and reviews in many literary journals and anthologies. Bledsoe has been nominated for the Pushcart Prize ten times, Best of the Net twice, and won the Blue Collar Review’s Working People’s Poetry Contest in 2004. He currently lives outside Baltimore..

== Early life ==
Bledsoe was born in Wynne, Arkansas and grew up on a working rice farm. In addition to rice, soybeans, milo, and other crops, his family raised and sold cattle, catfish, and buffalo fish. His mother suffered from Huntington's disease. Bledsoe’s experiences on his family’s farm and his mother’s illness greatly influenced his writing, especially his early poetry, much of which has been collected in Riceland.

== Education ==
In high school, Bledsoe co-founded a punk rock band, alternately called Maria Static, and later Shizknit. They performed sporadically around Arkansas before breaking up in 2001.

Bledsoe received a Bachelor’s in Arts with a focus in Creative Writing from the University of Arkansas in 2005. While there, he worked as an editor for Exposure: the University of Arkansas’ Literary and Visual Arts Journal (now defunct). He received a Master’s of Fine Arts in Creative Writing from Hollins University in 2008 and worked as an assistant poetry editor, and later assistant editor, for the Hollins Critic. While at Hollins, he cofounded Ghoti Magazine and was head editor until the journal ceased publication in 2010.

== List of works ==
=== Poetry ===
- Anthem (Cervena Barva Press 2009)
- _____(Want/Need) (Plan B Press, 2009)
- Leap Year (Red Ceilings Press, 2011)
- Riceland (Unbound Content, 2013)

=== Fiction ===
- Naming the Animals, collected stories (Mary Celeste Press, 2011)
- Last Stand in Zombietown (Damnation Press, 2013)
- Sunlight (Etopia Press, 2012)
- Necro-Files: $7.50/hr + Curses (Etopia Press, 2013)
- Necro-Files: Bloody Sexy (Etopia Press, 2014)
- Necro-Files: Tall, Dark, & Hairy (Etopia Press, 2015)
- Sorting the Dead (Damnation Press, 2015)
- Man of Clay (Main Street Rag Press, 2015)

== Reception ==
In a review in Neon, Christopher Frost called _____ (Want/Need) “complex and elegant”. In a recent review in the Arkansas Review, Monica Hooper called Anthem “a brilliant, but humble, collection of poetry that reflects a long-awaited shift in Southern Poetry” (40,3). “Leaving the Garden” from Naming the Animals was selected as a Notable Story of 2008 by Story South's Million Readers Award. His story "The Scream" was selected as a Notable Story of 2010 by Story South's Million Readers Award.
