= Parkin, Arkansas =

- City
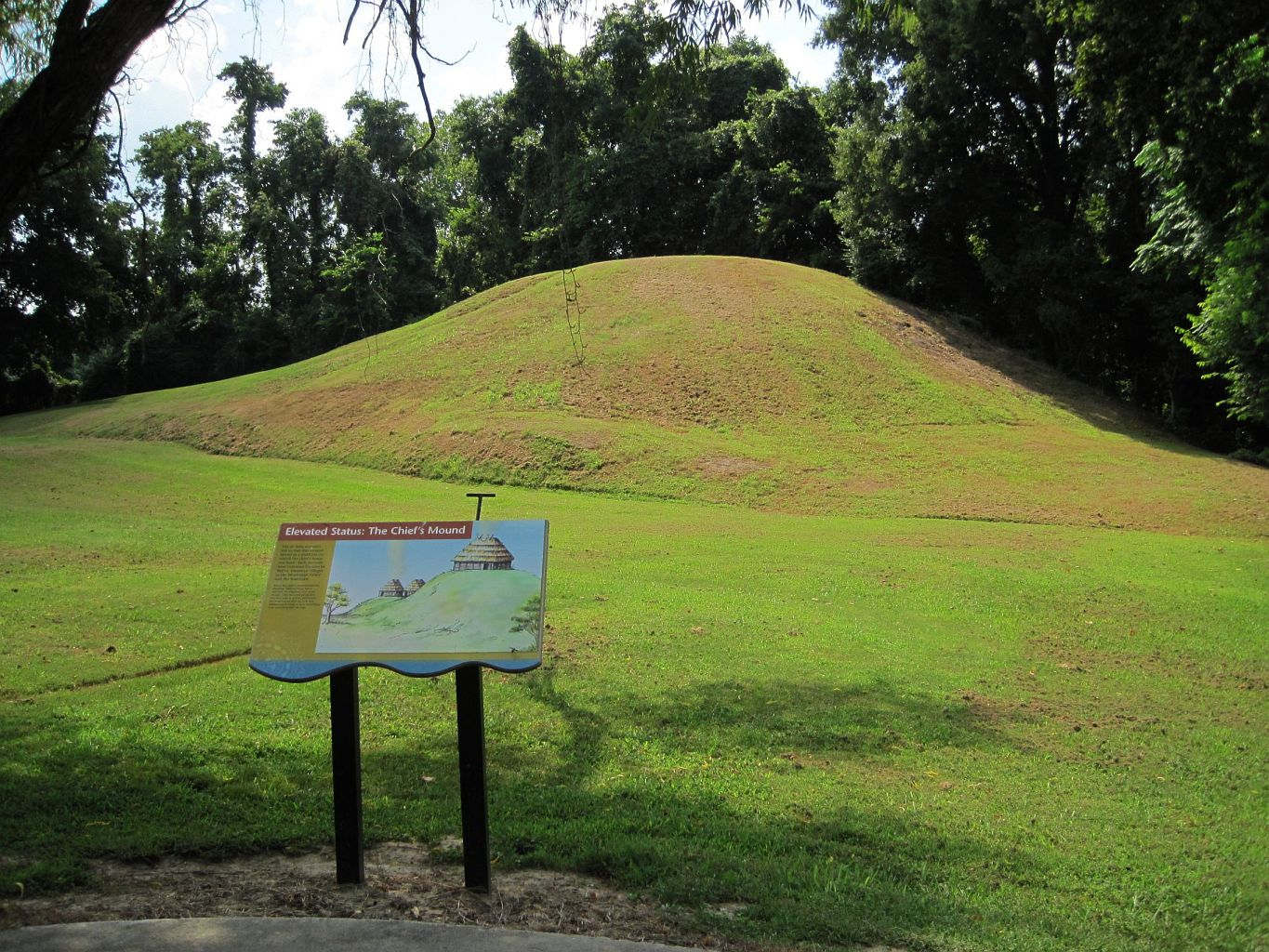
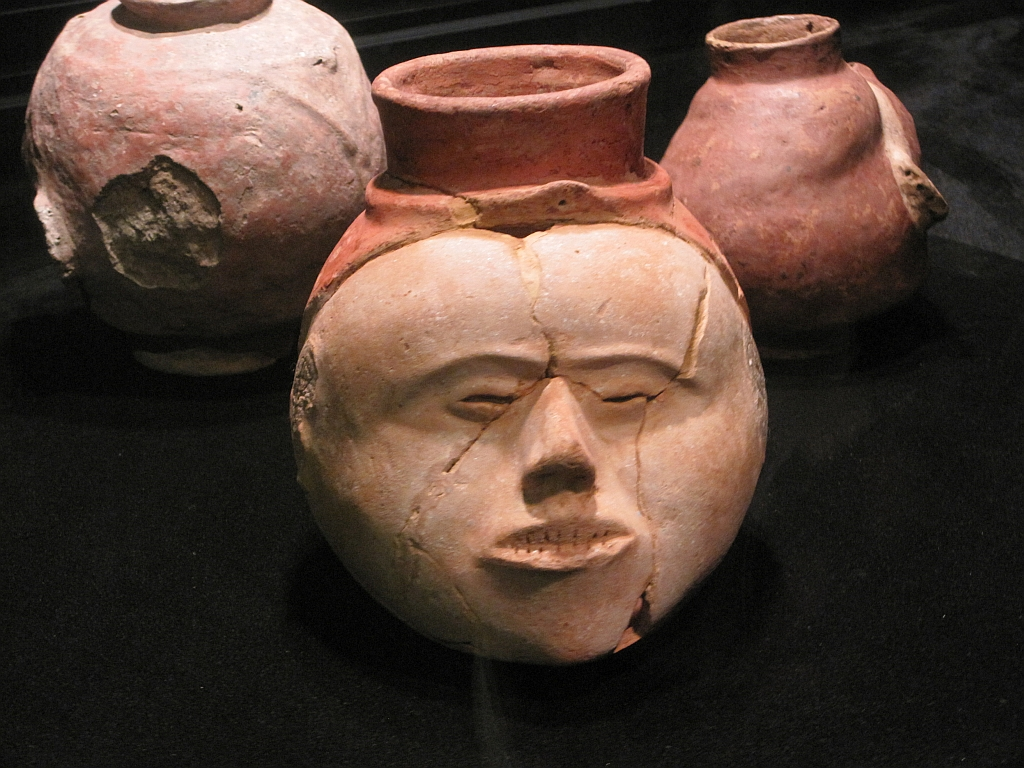
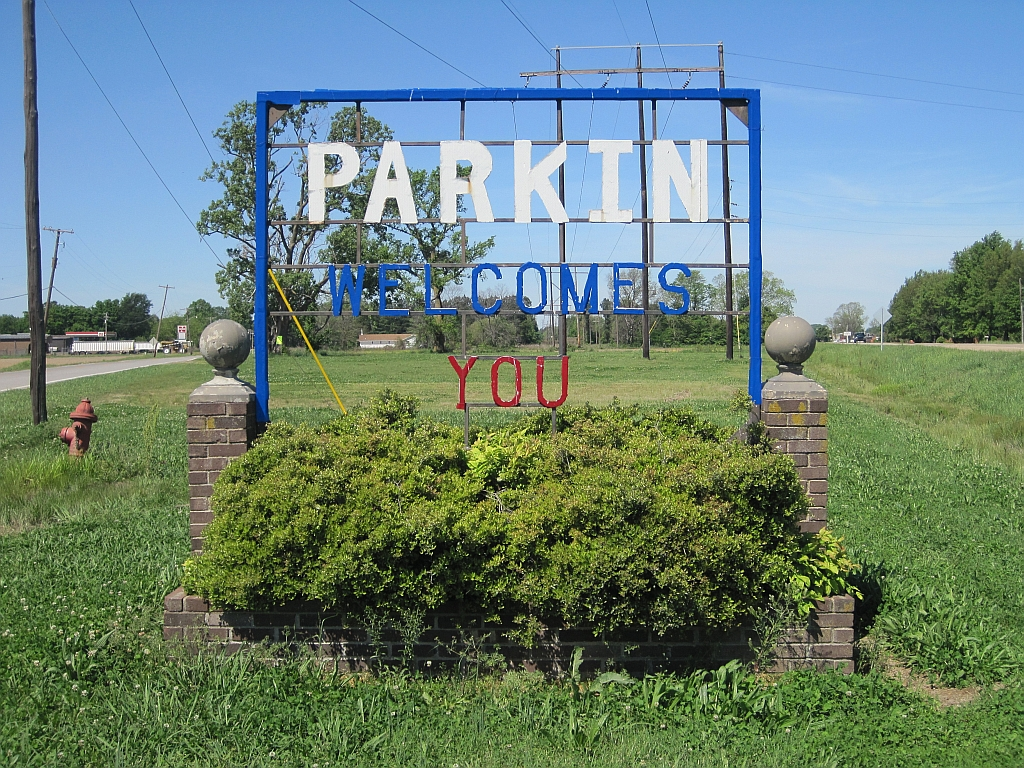
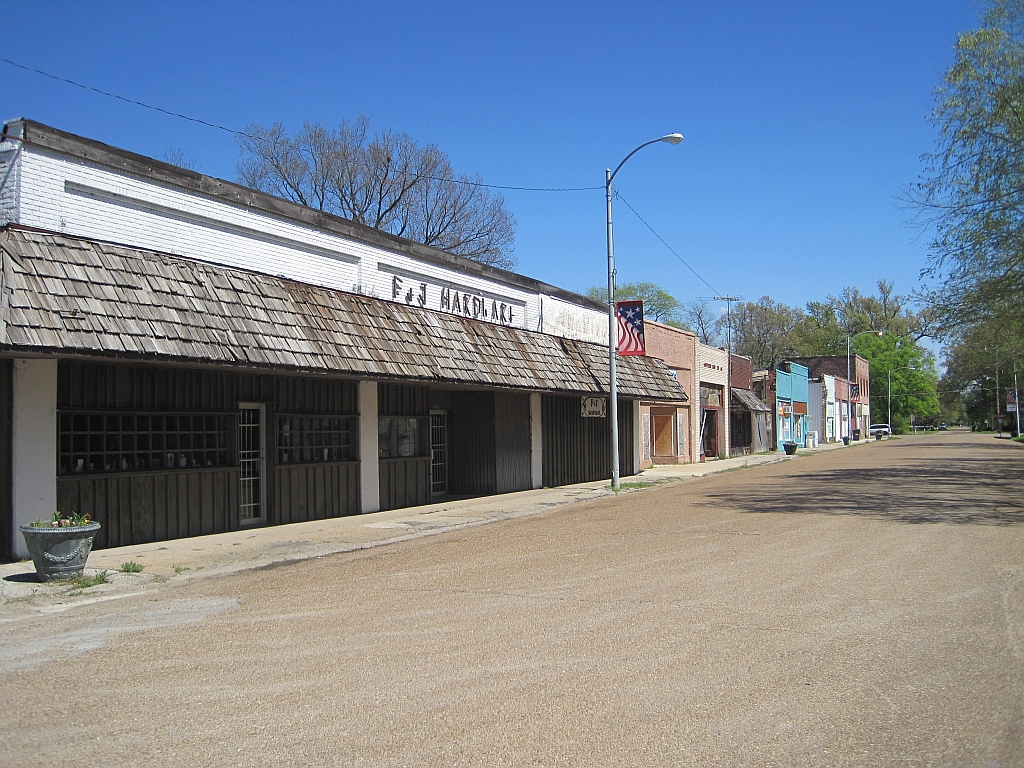
- Clockwise from top: Pottery at Parkin Archeological State Park, Streetside in Parkin, Welcome Sign entering Parkin, Indian Mound at Parkin Archeological State Park

- Location of Parkin in Cross County, Arkansas.
- Coordinates: 35°14′55″N 90°33′20″W
- Country: United States
- State: Arkansas
- County: Cross

Area
  - Total: 2.59 sq mi (6.70 km^{2})
  - Land: 2.56 sq mi (6.62 km^{2})
  - Water: 0.027 sq mi (0.07 km^{2})
- Elevation: 207 ft (63 m)

Population (2020)
  - Total: 794
  - Estimate (2025): 766 ▼
  - Density: 310.5/sq mi (119.87/km^{2})
- Time zone: UTC-6 (Central (CST))
  - Summer (DST): UTC-5 (CDT)
- ZIP code: 72373
- Area code: 870
- FIPS code: 05-53600
- GNIS feature ID: 2404481

Parkin is a city in Cross County, Arkansas, United States, along the St. Francis River. The population was 1,105 at the 2010 census, down from 1,602 in 2000. In the 2020 census, it dropped further to 794 people. Due to the recent population loss, a large segment of the downtown area has many abandoned and boarded-up buildings. The town has recently become known as a speed trap.

== Geography ==
Parkin is located in eastern Cross County on the east bank of the St. Francis River just south of the mouth of the Tyronza River. U.S. Route 64 passes through the community, leading east 5 miles (8 km) to Earle and west 14 miles (23 km) to Wynne, the Cross County seat.

According to the United States Census Bureau, the city has a total area of 2.5 square miles (6.6 km^{2}), all land.

== Demographics ==
Historical population
Census	Pop.	Note	%±
1920	1,378		—
1930	1,676		21.6%
1940	1,412		−15.8%
1950	1,414		0.1%
1960	1,489		5.3%
1970	1,731		16.3%
1980	2,035		17.6%
1990	1,847		−9.2%
2000	1,602		−13.3%
2010	1,105		−31.0%
2020	794		−28.1%
2025 (est.)	766	▼	−3.5%
U.S. Decennial Census

=== 2020 census ===
Parkin Racial Composition
Race	Num.	Perc.
White	207	26.07%
Black or African American	526	66.25%
Native American	2	0.25%
Other/Mixed	39	4.91%
Hispanic or Latino	20	2.52%

As of the 2020 United States census, there were 794 people, 312 households, and 147 families residing in the city.

=== 2000 census ===
As of the census of 2000, there were 1,602 people, 603 households, and 404 families residing in the city. The population density was 627.2 inhabitants per square mile (242.2/km^{2}). There were 657 housing units at an average density of 257.2 per square mile (99.3/km^{2}). The racial makeup of the city was 10.40% White, 88.54% Black or African American, 0.44% Native American, 0.06% Asian, 0.06% Pacific Islander, 0.19% from other races, and 0.31% from two or more races. 0.69% of the population were Hispanic or Latino of any race.

There were 603 households, out of which 30.0% had children under the age of 18 living with them, 38.6% were married couples living together, 22.9% had a female householder with no husband present, and 33.0% were non-families. 30.0% of all households were made up of individuals, and 17.7% had someone living alone who was 65 years of age or older. The average household size was 2.66 and the average family size was 3.30.

In the city, the population was spread out, with 31.7% under the age of 18, 7.9% from 18 to 24, 24.5% from 25 to 44, 19.4% from 45 to 64, and 16.5% who were 65 years of age or older. The median age was 34 years. For every 100 females, there were 83.9 males. For every 100 females age 18 and over, there were 79.1 males.

The median income for a household in the city was $18,669, and the median income for a family was $25,893. Males had a median income of $22,667 versus $16,413 for females. The per capita income for the city was $11,050. About 27.7% of families and 36.1% of the population were below the poverty line, including 48.7% of those under age 18 and 26.8% of those age 65 or over.

== Parkin Archeological State Park ==
Parkin Archeological State Park, also known as Parkin Indian Mound, is an archaeological site and state park in the north part of Parkin.

== Churches ==
Churches in Parkin include:

- First United Methodist Church - notable for the chimes that ring and play hymns throughout the day.
- First Baptist
- Gladden Baptist Church

== Speed Trap ==
Parkin has become known as a notorious speed trap for vehicles traveling along Route 64. This has been a problem for many years, with reports stemming back to 2007. A common practice for the police officer is to issue "Inattentive Driving Citations", breaking Parkin's City Ordinance 269. This results in a fine over $275 instead of a normal speeding ticket, and this money goes straight to the city, as they use the city ordinance. This results in over 30% of the city's income each year (handing out over 2500 Ordinance 269 violations). As of April 2026, Parkin Police has been barred from issuing citations along Route 64 after an investigation by the Arkansas State Police under the "Arkansas Speed Trap Law."

== Education ==
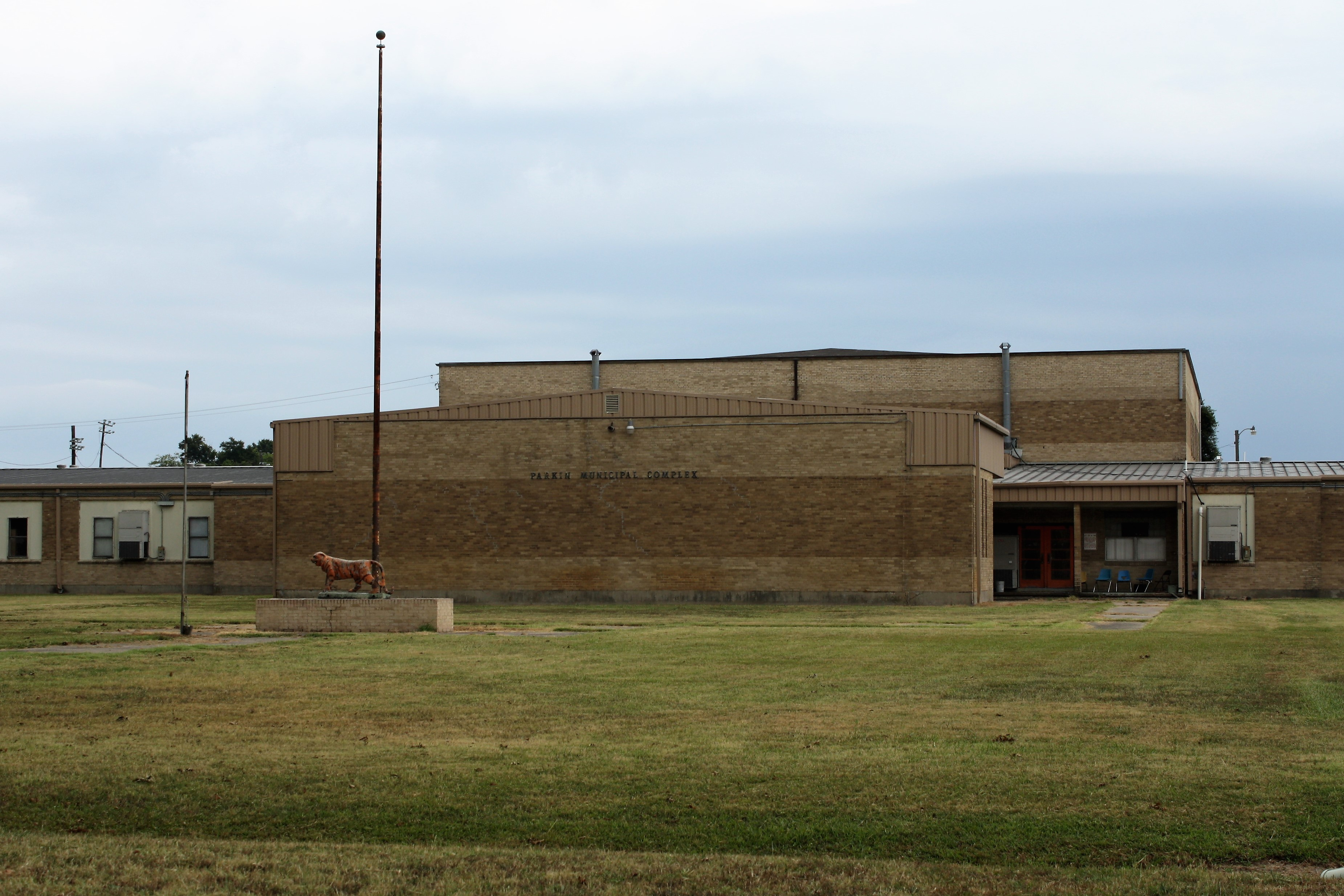
Parkin High School closed in 2005, it now serves as the municipal complex

The Wynne School District serves Parkin; it operates Wynne High School.

The former Parkin School District merged into the Wynne district on September 7, 2005.

== Notable people ==
- Dave Burnette, former NFL player
- Christopher Grace Founder, inventor, creator, CEO ShowKard.com
- Bette Greene, author
- Dave Hanner, NFL defensive tackle and assistant coach
- Isaiah Harris, Negro league baseball pitcher
- Harry Kelley, Major League Baseball player
- Lee Shot Williams, Blues singer
- Howlin' Wolf, Chicago blues singer, guitarist, and harmonica player
- Garland Williams, former NFL player and WWII veteran

== Gallery ==
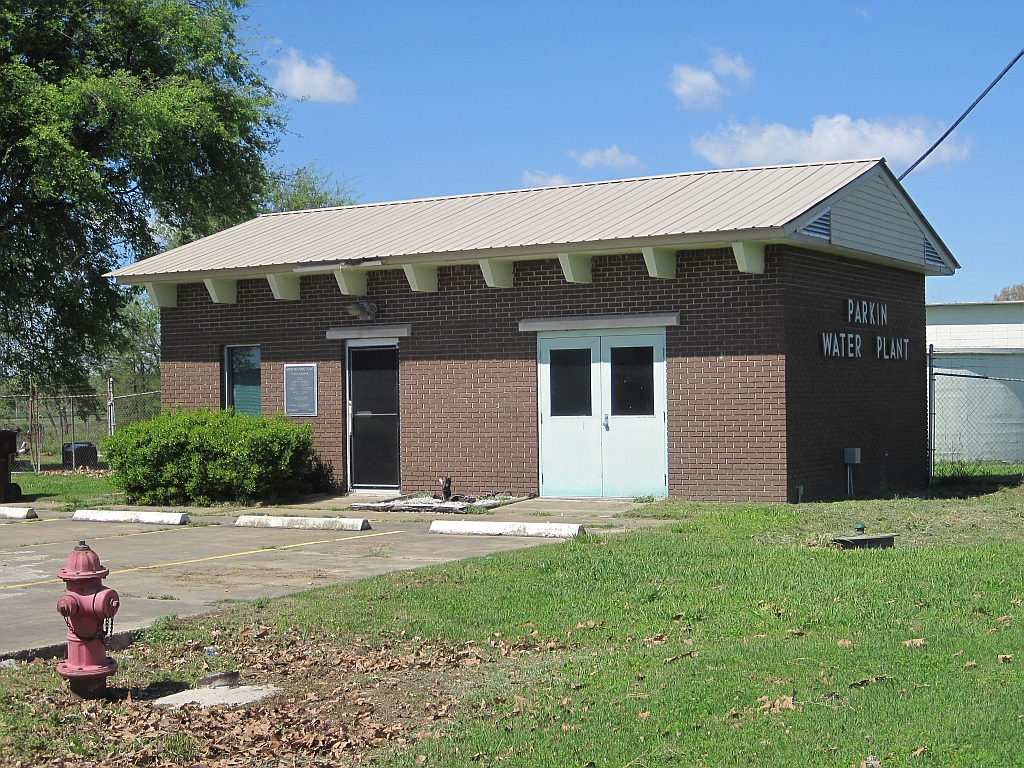
Water plant

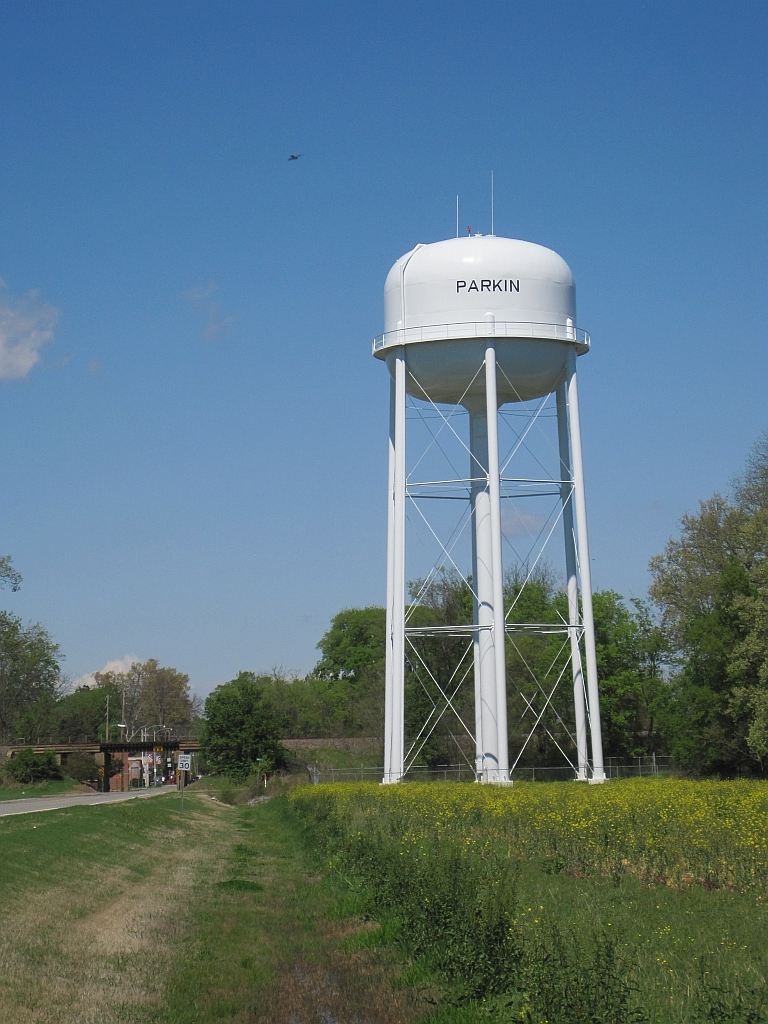
Water tower

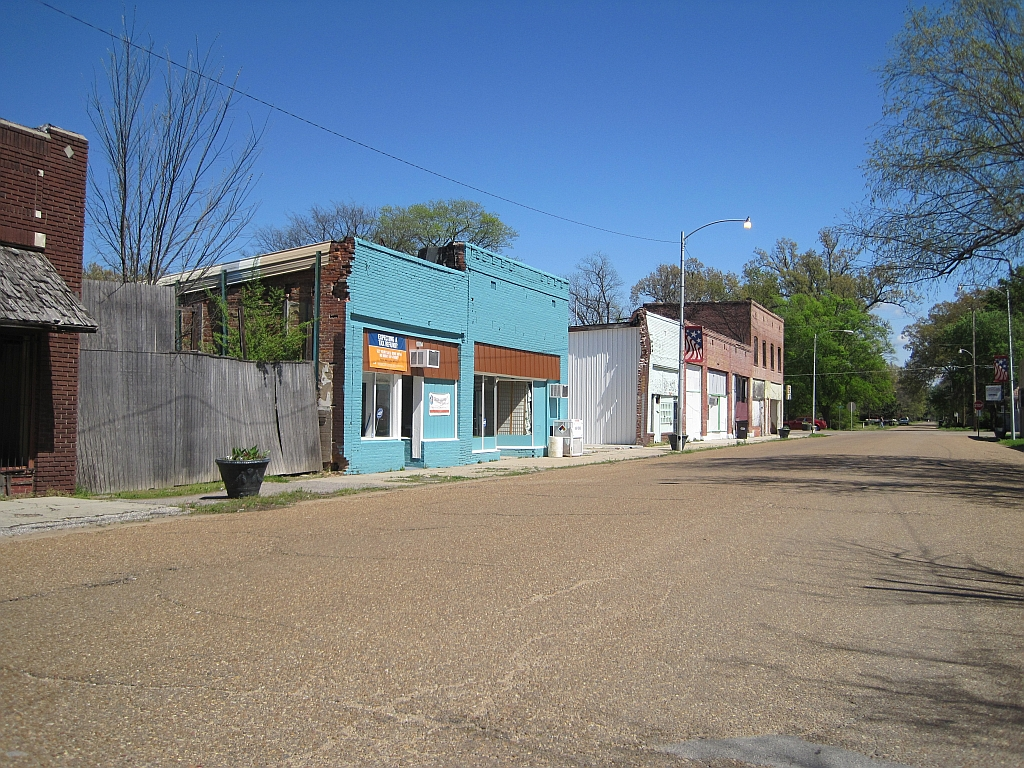
Downtown

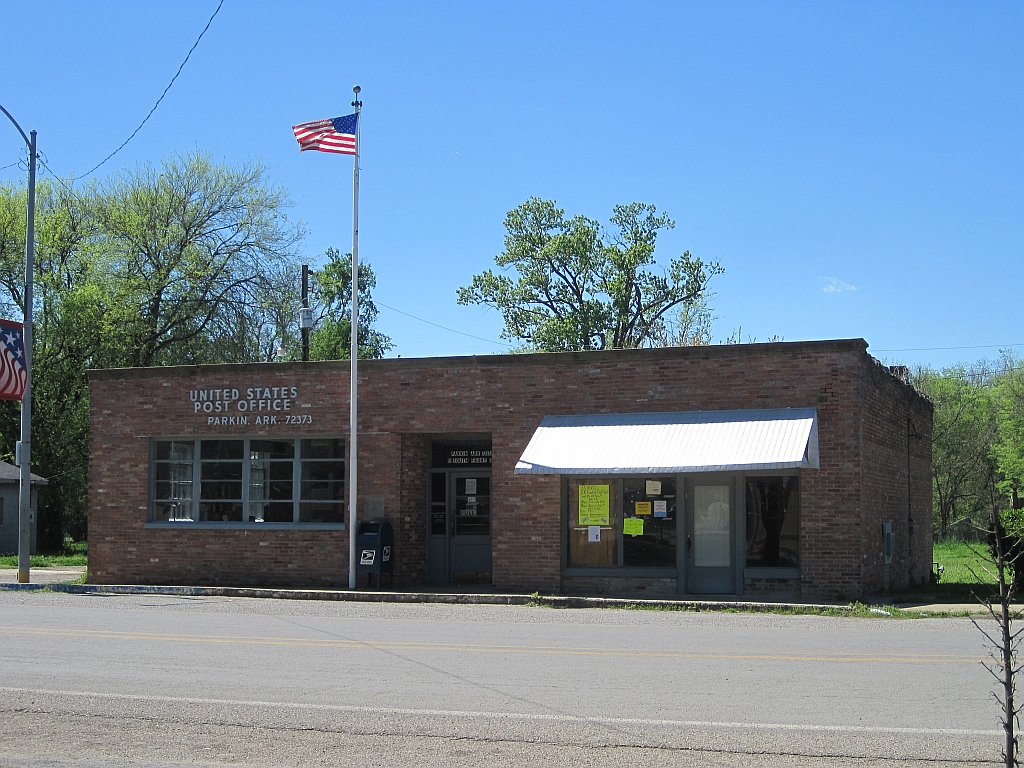
Post office

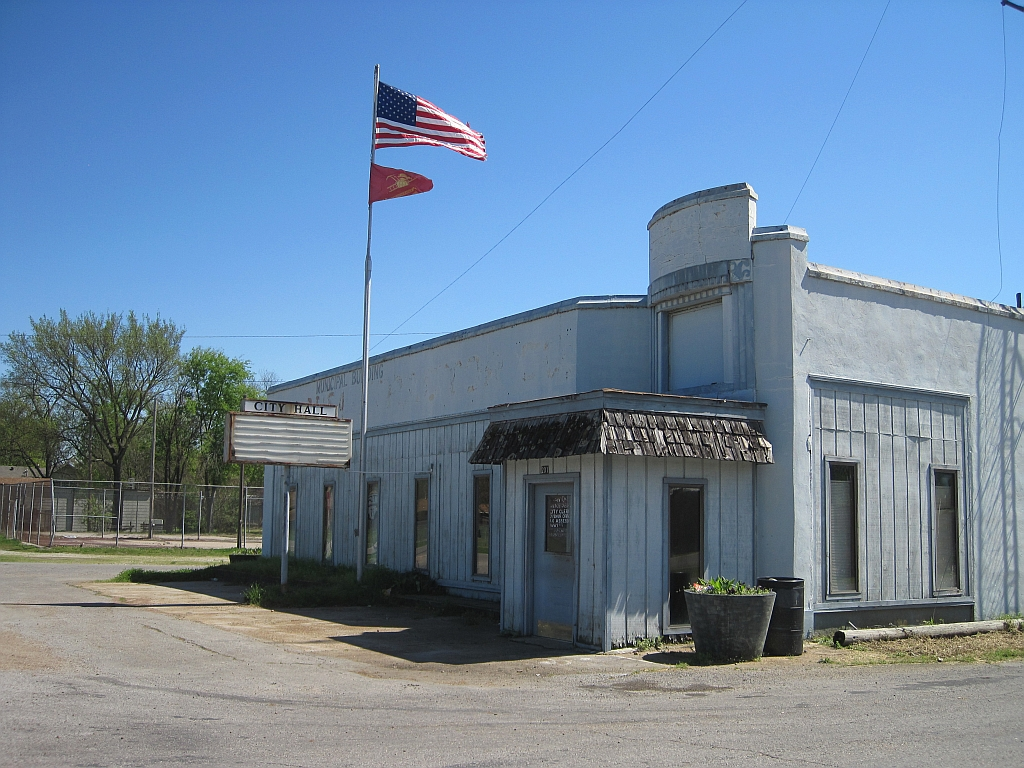
Former city hall

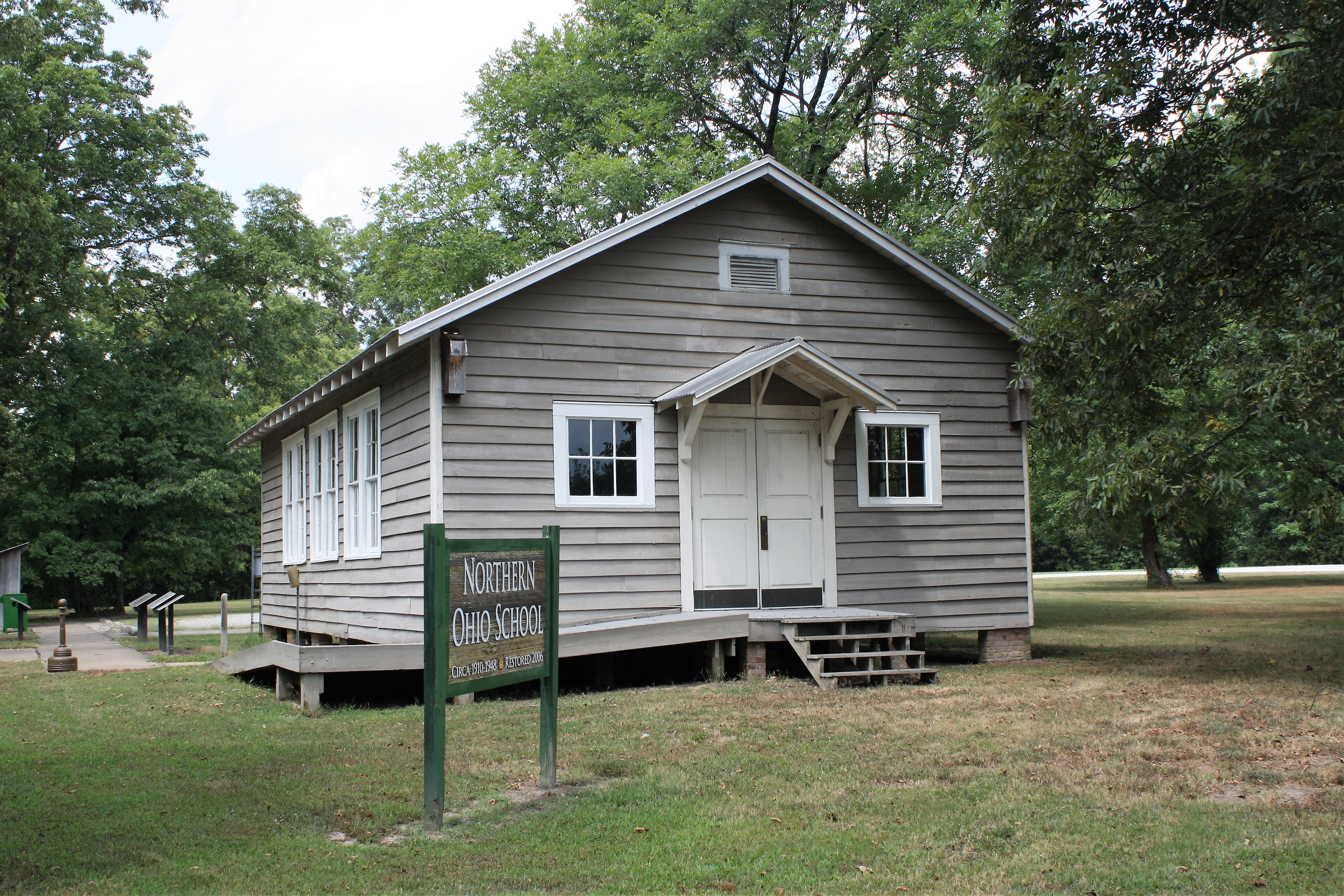
Northern Ohio School
