= Dave Burnette =

American football player (born 1961)

No. 73
- Position: Offensive tackle

Personal information
- Born: March 24, 1961 (age 65); Parkin, Arkansas, U.S.
- Listed height: 6 ft 6 in (1.98 m)
- Listed weight: 278 lb (126 kg)

Career information
- High school: Parkin
- College: Central Arkansas
- NFL draft: 1985: 12th round, 312th overall pick

Career history
- Indianapolis Colts (1985)*; New York Jets (1986)*; Atlanta Falcons (1987)*; Dallas Cowboys (1987)
- * Offseason or practice squad member only

Awards and highlights
- 2× All-AIC (1983, 1984); 2× NAIA All-District 17 (1983, 1984); NAIA All-American (1984)

Career NFL statistics
- Games played: 1
- Stats at Pro Football Reference

David Lynn Burnette (born March 24, 1961) is an American former professional football player who was an offensive tackle for the Dallas Cowboys of the National Football League (NFL). He played college football for the Central Arkansas Bears.

== Early life ==
Burnette attended Parkin High School, where he played football and basketball. He accepted a football scholarship from the University of Arkansas. He transferred after his sophomore season to the University of Central Arkansas, where he played as a defensive tackle.

As a junior, he posted 99 tackles (second on the team), 18 tackles for loss, 3 sacks and one pass breakup. As a senior, he registered 77 tackles (fifth on the team), 7 tackles for loss, 3 sacks and one blocked kick, while helping the school win its first NAIA national championship.

He also practiced basketball. As a junior, he appeared in 13 games (3 starts), averaging 5.3 points and 3.7 rebounds per contest.

== Professional career ==
Burnette was selected by the Indianapolis Colts in the 12th round (312th overall) of the 1985 NFL draft. He was converted into an offensive tackle during training camp. He was waived on August 19.

On April 24, 1986, he was signed as a free agent by the New York Jets. He was cut before the start of the season.

In 1987, he signed as a free agent with the Atlanta Falcons. He was released on September 1.

After the NFLPA strike was declared on the third week of the 1987 season, those contests were canceled (reducing the 16 game season to 15) and the NFL decided that the games would be played with replacement players. In September, he was signed to be a part of the Dallas Cowboys replacement team that was given the mock name "Rhinestone Cowboys" by the media. He was the backup at left tackle behind Daryle Smith. He was released after the strike ended on October 20.
