= Wynne School District =

School district in Arkansas, United States

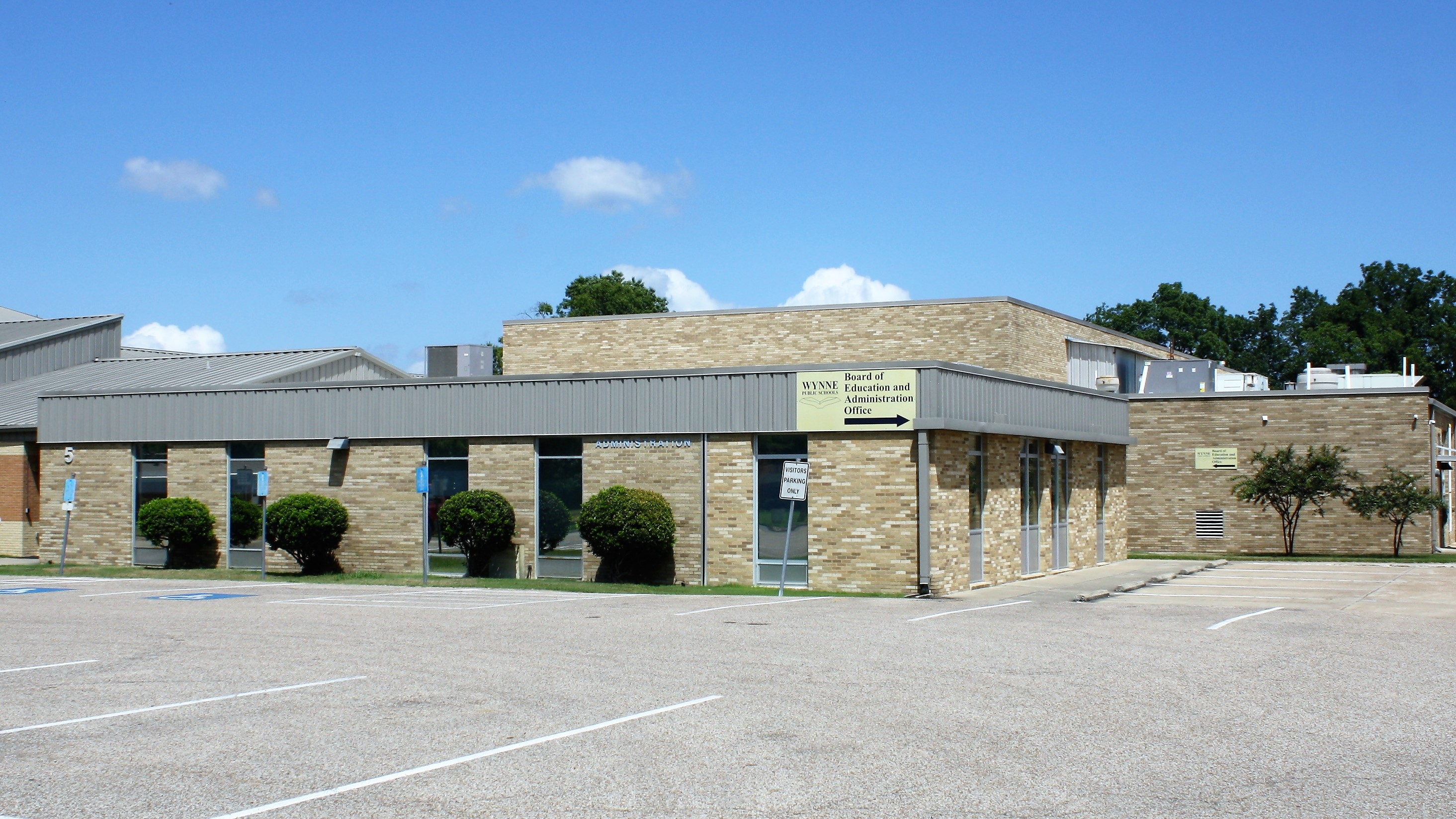
District office

Wynne School District 9 is a school district in Cross County, Arkansas, headquartered in Wynne. It serves Wynne and Parkin.

The district operates Wynne Primary School, Wynne Intermediate School, Wynne Junior High School, and Wynne Senior High School.

On September 7, 2005, the former Parkin School District merged into the Wynne School District.
