= Wynne, Arkansas =

- City
- Location of Wynne in Cross County, Arkansas.
- Coordinates: 35°13′39″N 90°47′22″W
- Country: United States
- State: Arkansas
- County: Cross
- Post office opened: September 27, 1882

Area
  - Total: 9.00 sq mi (23.32 km^{2})
  - Land: 8.99 sq mi (23.29 km^{2})
  - Water: 0.012 sq mi (0.03 km^{2})
- Elevation: 262 ft (80 m)

Population (2020)
  - Total: 8,314
  - Estimate (2025): 7,884 ▼
  - Density: 924.4/sq mi (356.92/km^{2})
- Time zone: UTC−6 (Central (CST))
  - Summer (DST): UTC−5 (CDT)
- ZIP code: 72396
- Area code: 870
- FIPS code: 05-77090
- GNIS feature ID: 2405797
- Website: www.cityofwynne.gov

Wynne (/ˈwɪn/) is the largest city in and the county seat of Cross County, Arkansas, United States. The population was 8,314 at the 2020 Census. Nestled between the Arkansas Delta and Crowley's Ridge, Wynne is the closest city to the second-largest state park in Arkansas, Village Creek State Park.

== Early history ==
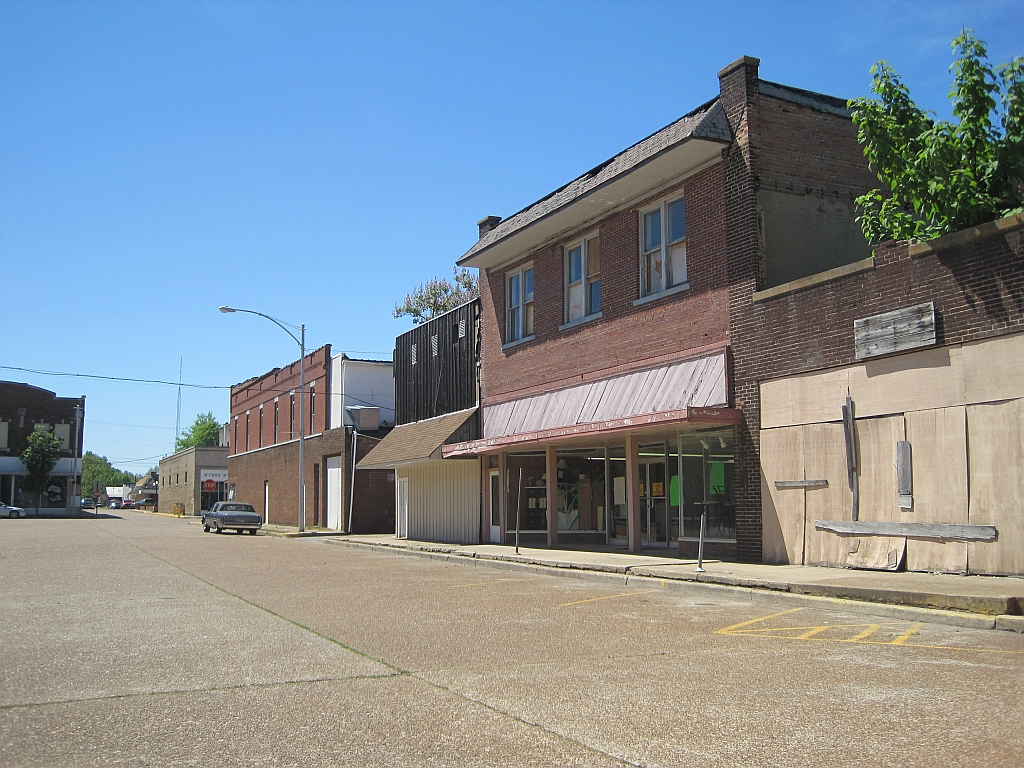
The Commercial District is one of ten sites in Wynne listed on the National Register of Historic Places.

Wynne was named for Captain Jesse Watkins Wynne, a Texan who achieved the rank of captain in the Civil War at the age of just 21. He was famed for leading a group of his captors up to the Confederate lines, where he then marched them to headquarters as his own prisoners.

In 1867, Captain Wynne moved to St. Francis County, Arkansas, and joined the finance company of Dennis & Beck. At that time, the Dennis & Beck company held savings for other companies and for individuals, but eventually, it became the Bank of Eastern Arkansas, and Wynne became its first president.

From 1880 to 1885, as the St. Louis, Iron Mountain, and Southern Railroad was under construction, active steamboat riverports like Wittsburg, at that time the county seat of Cross County, were deserted for the railroads.

The location of the settlement of Wynne was first chosen in 1882, when a train derailed, leaving one boxcar without wheels and off the tracks. That boxcar was then turned upright as a building, and as a compliment to Captain Wynne, it was designated the "Wynne Station". On September 27, 1882, the Wynne Station Post Office was opened.

When the east–west railroad line was completed, it crossed the north–south line near the boxcar, and the name "Wynne Junction" became well known in the area. On May 28, 1888, the "Junction" part of the name was dropped, and the town of Wynne was formed.

By the 1890s, the railroad traffic and the resulting activity in Wynne made it a more vibrant town than the town of Vanndale, which had been the county seat since 1886. In 1903, the county seat of Cross County was moved to Wynne.

With the advent of the U.S. Highway System in the 1920s and 30s, U.S. Route 64 was built west from Memphis, through Wynne, and to points west. Also, the north–south Arkansas Highway 1 was built through Wynne, making it an important highway crossroads for several decades, in addition to being a railroad town. Since the advent of the Interstate Highway System, Interstate 40 has largely diverted long-distance travel away from Wynne.

On Friday, March 31, 2023, shortly after 4:30 P.M., an intense EF3 tornado with winds reaching 150 miles per hour struck the community. Four people died and 26 people were injured. Numerous homes and businesses, including Wynne High School, were damaged or destroyed. The tornado was on the ground for 73 miles, dissipating in Tipton County, Tennessee.

== Geography ==
Wynne lies in south-central Cross County along the boundary between two distinct geographical areas of Arkansas: the fertile farmland of the Arkansas Delta (which is a part of the larger Mississippi Alluvial Plain), and Crowley's Ridge, a distinct rise marking the New Madrid Fault Line.

U.S. Route 64 passes through the northern side of the city, leading east 37 miles (60 km) to Marion and west 58 miles (93 km) to Searcy. Arkansas Highway 1 leads north 25 miles (40 km) to Harrisburg and south 14 miles (23 km) to Interstate 40 at Forrest City.

According to the United States Census Bureau, Wynne has a total area of 8.9 square miles (23.0 km^{2}), of which 0.012 square miles (0.03 km^{2}), or 0.12%, is water.

=== Climate ===
The climate in this area is characterized by hot, humid summers and generally mild to cool winters. According to the Köppen climate classification system, Wynne has a humid subtropical climate, abbreviated "Cfa" on climate maps.

Climate data for Wynne, Arkansas (1991–2020 normals, extremes 1908–present)
Month	Jan	Feb	Mar	Apr	May	Jun	Jul	Aug	Sep	Oct	Nov	Dec	Year
Record high °F (°C)	84 (29)	88 (31)	91 (33)	93 (34)	99 (37)	106 (41)	108 (42)	110 (43)	109 (43)	97 (36)	88 (31)	80 (27)	110 (43)
Mean daily maximum °F (°C)	49.1 (9.5)	53.7 (12.1)	62.6 (17.0)	72.9 (22.7)	81.6 (27.6)	89.6 (32.0)	91.8 (33.2)	91.1 (32.8)	86.0 (30.0)	75.9 (24.4)	62.1 (16.7)	52.1 (11.2)	72.4 (22.4)
Daily mean °F (°C)	40.3 (4.6)	44.0 (6.7)	52.5 (11.4)	62.1 (16.7)	71.6 (22.0)	79.7 (26.5)	82.2 (27.9)	80.7 (27.1)	74.3 (23.5)	63.8 (17.7)	51.8 (11.0)	43.5 (6.4)	62.2 (16.8)
Mean daily minimum °F (°C)	31.5 (−0.3)	34.4 (1.3)	42.4 (5.8)	51.4 (10.8)	61.7 (16.5)	69.8 (21.0)	72.6 (22.6)	70.2 (21.2)	62.5 (16.9)	51.8 (11.0)	41.6 (5.3)	34.8 (1.6)	52.1 (11.2)
Record low °F (°C)	−10 (−23)	−10 (−23)	7 (−14)	25 (−4)	33 (1)	42 (6)	51 (11)	48 (9)	32 (0)	18 (−8)	10 (−12)	−4 (−20)	−10 (−23)
Average precipitation inches (mm)	3.71 (94)	4.26 (108)	5.11 (130)	5.70 (145)	5.09 (129)	3.58 (91)	3.35 (85)	2.69 (68)	3.30 (84)	4.15 (105)	4.43 (113)	5.22 (133)	50.59 (1,285)
Average snowfall inches (cm)	0.7 (1.8)	0.7 (1.8)	0.3 (0.76)	0.0 (0.0)	0.0 (0.0)	0.0 (0.0)	0.0 (0.0)	0.0 (0.0)	0.0 (0.0)	0.0 (0.0)	0.1 (0.25)	0.2 (0.51)	2.0 (5.1)
Average precipitation days (≥ 0.01 in)	10.3	9.2	10.4	9.5	11.0	7.8	8.2	6.6	6.7	7.6	9.0	9.5	105.8
Average snowy days (≥ 0.1 in)	0.7	0.5	0.1	0.0	0.0	0.0	0.0	0.0	0.0	0.0	0.1	0.2	1.6
Source: NOAA

== Demographics ==
Historical population
Census	Pop.	Note	%±
1890	565		—
1900	1,629		188.3%
1910	2,353		44.4%
1920	2,933		24.6%
1930	3,505		19.5%
1940	3,633		3.7%
1950	4,142		14.0%
1960	4,922		18.8%
1970	6,696		36.0%
1980	7,927		18.4%
1990	8,187		3.3%
2000	8,615		5.2%
2010	8,367		−2.9%
2020	8,314		−0.6%
2025 (est.)	7,884	▼	−5.2%
U.S. Decennial Census

=== 2020 census ===
As of the 2020 census, Wynne had a population of 8,314. The median age was 38.1 years. 26.6% of residents were under the age of 18 and 17.5% of residents were 65 years of age or older. For every 100 females there were 85.5 males, and for every 100 females age 18 and over there were 79.2 males age 18 and over.

91.0% of residents lived in urban areas, while 9.0% lived in rural areas.

There were 3,329 households in Wynne, and there were 2,052 families residing in the city. Of all households, 33.6% had children under the age of 18 living in them, 39.2% were married-couple households, 16.8% were households with a male householder and no spouse or partner present, and 38.4% were households with a female householder and no spouse or partner present. About 30.7% of all households were made up of individuals and 13.5% had someone living alone who was 65 years of age or older.

There were 3,702 housing units, of which 10.1% were vacant. The homeowner vacancy rate was 2.6% and the rental vacancy rate was 8.5%.

Racial composition as of the 2020 census
Race	Number	Percent
White	5,038	60.6%
Black or African American	2,720	32.7%
American Indian and Alaska Native	23	0.3%
Asian	93	1.1%
Native Hawaiian and Other Pacific Islander	1	0.0%
Some other race	82	1.0%
Two or more races	357	4.3%
Hispanic or Latino (of any race)	205	2.5%

=== 2000 census ===
According to the census of 2000, there were 8,615 people, 3,245 households, and 2,323 families residing in the city. The population density was 1,056.5 inhabitants per square mile (407.9/km^{2}). There were 3,476 housing units at an average density of 426.3 per square mile (164.6/km^{2}). The racial makeup of the city was 75.91% White, 22.32% Black or African American, 0.15% Native American, 0.48% Asian, 0.27% from other races, and 0.88% from two or more races. 1.03% of the population were Hispanic or Latino of any race.

There were 3,245 households, out of which 36.1% had children under the age of 18 living with them, 48.5% were married couples living together, 19.0% had a female householder with no husband present, and 28.4% were non-families. 26.2% of all households were made up of individuals, and 12.6% had someone living alone who was 65 years of age or older. The average household size was 2.56 and the average family size was 3.09.

The age distribution of the population shows 28.7% under the age of 18, 8.7% from 18 to 24, 27.4% from 25 to 44, 20.4% from 45 to 64, and 14.8% who were 65 years of age or older. The median age was 35 years. For every 100 females, there were 87.9 males. For every 100 woman age 18 and over, there were 80.4 men.

The median income for a household in the city was $30,125, and the median income for a family was $35,714. Males had a median income of $30,506 versus $20,567 for females. The per capita income for the city was $15,800. About 17.9% of families and 21.4% of the population were below the poverty line, including 30.7% of those under age 18 and 17.6% of those age 65 or over.

== Education ==
The Wynne School District consists of four different schools. The first school is Wynne Primary School which is for children in grades Kindergarten through second grade. The second school is Wynne Intermediate School which is for children in grades 3–5. The third school is Wynne Junior High School which is for grades 6–8. The fourth school, Wynne High School is for grades 9–12.

Wynne also has a branch of the East Arkansas Community College located on Falls Boulevard.

The New Hope School was one of the original buildings constructed to serve students of District 25. It was donated in 2007 to the Cross County Historical Society where it was restored to its original appearance. In 2008, it was added to the U.S. National Register of Historic Places.

== Notable people ==
- Jessica Andrews, country music singer
- Cortney Lance Bledsoe, poet, writer, and book reviewer, born in Wynne in 1976
- Ronald R. Caldwell, Republican Arkansas state senator from District 23; a Wynne real estate businessman
- Clay Ford (1938–2013), Republican former member of the Florida House of Representatives from 2007 until his death; member of the Arkansas House of Representatives from 1975 to 1976; born in Wynne
- Carlos Norman Hathcock II, (May 20, 1942 – February 22, 1999) a United States Marine Corps sniper with a service record of 93 confirmed kills, and the real life basis for the 1993 Tom Berenger film, Sniper.
- Rick Husky, television producer
- James Luker, Arkansas state legislator and mayor of Wynne
- James Levesque "Bex" Shaver, Sr., ninth Lieutenant Governor of Arkansas.
- William L. Spicer, chairman of the Arkansas Republican Party from 1962 to 1964, lived in Wynne during his early years
- Hugh "Bones" Taylor, who played wide receiver with the Washington Redskins from 1947 to 1954, and was honored as one of the 70 Greatest Redskins in 2002. Taylor was later the head coach of the Houston Oilers in 1965, and was an assistant with the New York Titans, Pittsburgh Steelers, and the San Diego Chargers.
- DeAngelo Williams, a former Wynne Yellowjacket, is a retired running back who played in the NFL from 2006 to 2016.

== Notable places ==
- Cross County Courthouse
- Cross County Library
- Cross County Museum
- Historic Downtown Wynne
- Jesse Wynne Park
- Village Creek State Park

== Media ==
=== Newspapers ===
The Wynne Progress is the main newspaper in the city of Wynne. The Wynne, Arkansas Progress is in the Memphis, Tennessee DMA. It serves both Wynne and Cross County. It has been in publication for over 100 years. The Wynne Progress is published weekly.

=== Radio stations ===
KWYN is the main broadcasting station in the city of Wynne. They operate 92.5 FM which is primarily country music and 1400 AM which is primarily news and sports. These stations are part of the East Arkansas Broadcasters, Incorporated.

== See also ==
- 2023 Wynne-Parkin tornado
