= Parkin School District =

Defunct school district in Arkansas, United States

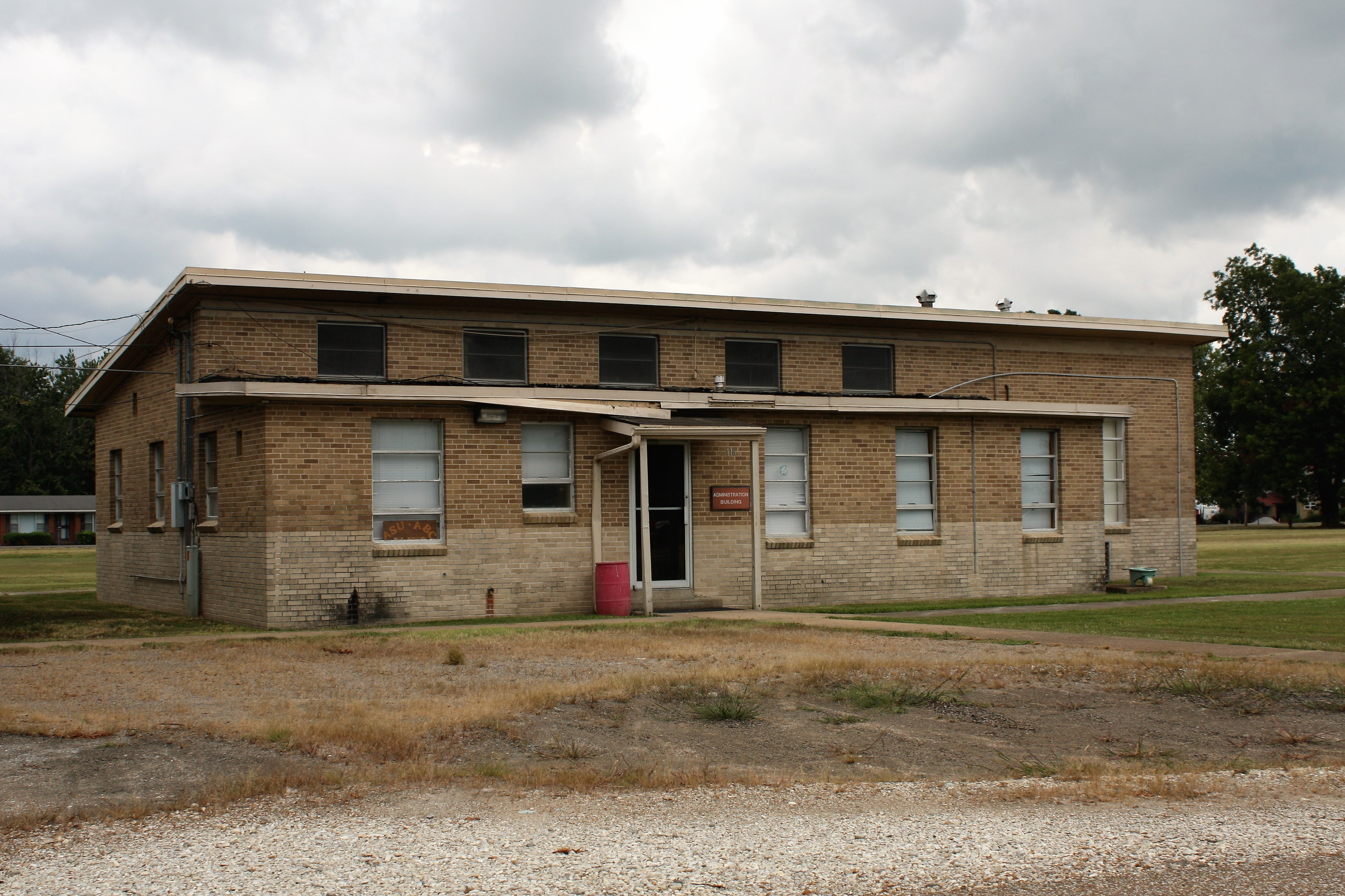

Location
- Parkin, Arkansas United States

District information
- Type: Public
- Grades: K-12
- Established: 1971
- Closed: September 5, 2005
- Accreditation: Arkansas Department of Education
- Schools: 2

Other information
- Schedule: US standard

Parkin School District was a school district headquartered in Parkin, Arkansas. It operated Parkin Elementary School and Parkin Junior and Senior High School.

On September 7, 2005, it merged into the Wynne School District.
