= Drummonds, Tennessee =

- Unincorporated community
- Location within Tennessee Location within the United States
- Coordinates: 35°27′48″N 89°54′36″W
- Country: United States
- State: Tennessee
- County: Tipton
- Elevation: 440 ft (130 m)
- Time zone: UTC-6 (Central (CST))
  - Summer (DST): UTC-5 (CDT)
- ZIP code: 38023
- Area code: 901
- GNIS feature ID: 1282816

Drummonds is an unincorporated community in Tipton County, Tennessee, United States. Its ZIP code is 38023.

Drummonds Elementary School is located in Drummonds, TN.

Fire and emergency services in Drummonds were formerly under the charge of the Quito-Drummonds Volunteer Fire Department. In June 2020, the Tipton County Fire Department was officially placed into service, taking over the former station.
